A war poet is a poet who participates in a war and writes about their experiences, or a non-combatant who writes poems about war. While the term is applied especially to those who served during the First World War, the term can be applied to a poet of any nationality writing about any war, including Homer's Iliad, from around the 8th century BC as well as poetry of the American Civil War, the Spanish Civil War, the Crimean War and other wars.

The Old Testament
The Book of Psalms contains many works of Hebrew poetry about war, many of which are attributed to King David, the second monarch of the Kingdom of Israel, who is said to have reigned c. 1010–970 BC.

The story of David's rise from shepherd to King also inspired the Davidiad, which is a 1517 heroic epic poem in Renaissance Latin by lawyer, judge, and Renaissance humanist Marko Marulić, who spent his life in Split, Croatia, which was under the rule of the Republic of Venice.

In addition to the small portions that attempt to recall the epics of Homer, Marulic's The Davidiad is heavily modeled upon Virgil's Aeneid. This is so much the case that Marulić's contemporaries called him the "Christian Virgil from Split." The late Serbian-American philologist Miroslav Marcovich also detected, "the influence of Ovid, Lucan, and Statius" in the work.

Marulić also wrote the epic poem Judita, which retells the events of the Book of Judith, while subtly depicting the soldiers of the Assyrian Empire as the Pre-Christian equivalent to the Turkish Janissaries and making multiple references and allusions to Classical mythology. The poem contains 2126 dodecasyllabic lines, with caesurae after the sixth syllable, composed in six books (libars). The linguistic basis of the book is the Split or Čakavian dialect the Štokavian lexis, combined with many words from the Old Church Slavonic translation of the Christian Bible. Judita thus foreshadows the creation of modern Croatian.

The Trojan War

The Iliad
The Iliad is an epic poem in dactylic hexameter which is believed to have been composed by Homer, a blind Greek Bard from Ionia, a district near Izmir in modern Turkey.

The Iliad is paired with its sequel, the Odyssey, which is also attributed to Homer. Together, both epics are among the oldest surviving works of Western literature, and are believed to have begun as oral literature. The first written form is usually dated to around the 8th century BC. In the standard accepted version, the text of the Iliad contains 15,693 lines and is written in Homeric Greek, a literary language derived from mixing Ionic Greek with other Ancient Greek dialects.

The Iliad is set during the ten-year siege of the polis of Troy (Ilium), ruled by King Priam and his sons Hector and Paris, by a massive army from a coalition of Greek states led by King Agamemnon of Mycenae.

Although the story covers only a few weeks in the final year of the war, the Iliad mentions or alludes to many of the Greek legends about the siege; the earlier events, such as the gathering of warriors for the siege, the cause of the war, and related concerns tend to appear near the beginning. Furthermore, the Greek gods not only watch the war as it progresses but actively intervene on behalf of those mortals whom they favor.

The epic begins with Homer's invocation to Calliope, the one of the Nine Muses responsible for inspiring both eloquence and epic poetry. Homer then relates a quarrel over a woman between Agamemnon and the warrior and demigod Achilles. Only divine intervention from his patroness Athena prevents Achilles from killing Agamemnon on the spot. Achilles, however, retreats to his tent, vowing not to come out until Agamemnon apologizes.

In the end, the slaying of his close friend Patroclus by Hector brings Achilles out of his tent with the intention of fighting Hector to the death. After a savage and brutal battle, Achilles slays Hector and repeatedly defiles his corpse. But after Priam enters his tent and pleads for the return of his son's body, Achilles relents and allows Priam to take the remains of Hector back inside the walls of the city.

Hector's funeral rites and the cremation of his body on a funeral pyre are related in detail.

Although the epic narrative ends right at this point, before Achilles' imminent death at the hands of Hector's brother Paris and the fall of Troy, these events are prefigured and alluded to quite vividly. Therefore, when The Iliad reaches its end, Homer has told the full story of the Trojan War.

Posthomerica
The events between the cremation of Hector and the Fall of Troy are expanded upon in the 4th century epic poem Posthomerica, by Quintus of Smyrna. His materials are borrowed from the cyclic poems from which Virgil's Aeneid also drew, in particular the Aethiopis (Coming of Memnon) and the Iliupersis (Destruction of Troy) of Arctinus of Miletus, the now-lost Heleneis of Philodoppides and the Ilias Mikra (Little Iliad) of Lesches. Quintus's work is closely modelled on Homer. For a long time, Quintus' work was considered inferior to Homer; however, it is now understood how inventively and creatively Quintus is responding to Homeric epic.

Pre-Islamic Persia

Ayadgar-i Zariran
Although its author is unknown, Ayadgar-i Zariran meaning "Memorial of Zarer", is a war poem which was preserved by Zoroastrian priests after the Muslim conquest of Persia. In its surviving manuscript form, "The Memorial of Zarer" represents one of the earliest surviving works of Iranian literature and the only surviving epic poem in Pahlavi. Historically, Iranian epic poems such as this one were composed and sung by travelling minstrels, who in pre-Islamic and Zoroastrian times were a fixture of Iranian society.

The poem of about 346 lines is a tale of the death in battle of the mythical hero Zarer and of the subsequent revenge for his death. The figures and events of the poem's story expand upon mythological characters and events alluded to in the Gathas, which are the autobiographical hymns that are attributed to the prophet Zoroaster.

Shahnameh
Ferdowsi's 11th century Shahnameh ("Book of Kings") retells the mythical and to some extent the historical past of the Persian Empire from the creation of the world until the Muslim conquest in the 7th century. It is one of the world's longest epic poems created by a single poet, and the national epic of Greater Iran. Ferdowsi is celebrated as one of the most influential figures of Persian literature and one of the greatest in the history of literature. The Shahnameh also contains many works of war poetry.

According to New Formalist poet and professor Dick Davis, who has translated Ferdowsi's whole epic into English, the lament over the Muslim conquest by the former court poet of Yazdegerd III, the last Zoroastrian King of Kings, remains an iconic poem within Iranian literature and culture and is still quoted as a criticism of political leaders who are considered to be governing the Iranian people badly.

The Wars between the Welsh and the Saxons

King Arthur
Thomas Gwynn Jones' hugely influential awdl Ymadawiad Arthur ("The Passing of Arthur") portrays King Arthur's last hours with his companion Bedwyr from the death of Medrawd at the Battle of Camlann until Arthur's final departure for Afallon.

The poem, according to Hywel Teifi Edwards, "brought back some of the mythopoeic grandeur which John Morris-Jones yearned for. More than that, he made of Bedwyr, the knight charged by Arthur to throw the great sword Excalibur into the lake, a prototype of the twentieth-century Welshman who, from generation to generation, armed only with a vision of his culture's worth, fights for its survival against an all-devouring materialism. Bedwyr, agonizing over the catastrophe which he feared would befall his defenseless country should he obey Arthur's command, is one of the most deeply moving figures in Welsh literature. Denied the security of a matchless weapon, the last tangible proof of Arthur's supernatural strength, he must fight on with only his faith in Arthur's promised return from Afalon to sustain him."

Unlike the many works of English, French, and German poetry inspired by the Arthurian legend, Ymadawiad Arthur makes frequent references to Welsh literature and the Welsh mythology of the Mabinogion, and is believed to derive its narrative flow from Jones's careful study of that same source. William Beynon Davies further considers Ymadawiad Arthur a work of subtly Christian poetry based on its many Biblical parallels, as King Arthur resembles in some ways the Messiah and in others the Suffering Servant.

The poem won its author the Bardic Chair at the National Eisteddfod in 1902.

J.R.R. Tolkien's epic poem The Fall of Arthur, written in alliterative verse and left unfinished at the time of Tolkien's death in 1973, depicts King Arthur as a Welsh King who has been battling against the Anglo-Saxon invasion of Britain.

The Battle of Catraeth
The foundational masterpiece of Welsh poetry, Y Gododdin, tells how 
Mynyddog Mwynfawr, the King of Gododdin in the Hen Ogledd, summoned warriors from several other Welsh kingdoms and provided them with a year's feasting in his mead hall at Din Eidyn (now the site of Edinburgh Castle in Scotland). Then, in 600 A.D., after attending both Mass and Confession, Mynyddog led them in a campaign against the Anglo-Saxons which culminated with the Battle of Catraeth (believed to have been fought at Catterick in North Yorkshire). After several days of fighting against overwhelming odds, Mynyddog and nearly all of his warriors were killed.

The manuscript contains several stanzas which have no connection with Y Gododdin and are considered to be interpolations. One stanza in particular has received attention because it compares one of the fallen warriors to King Arthur. This, if not a later interpolation, would be the earliest known reference to the character.

Welsh Bard Aneirin, who is believed to be the author, was also present at the Battle of Catraeth and was one of the only two-to-four Welsh survivors. Aneirin remained a captive until his ransom was paid by Ceneu ap Llywarch Hen.

Y Gododdin has survived in only one manuscript, the 13th century Book of Aneirin.

The Battle of Brunanburh
The Battle of Brunanburh was fought in 937 between an army led by Æthelstan, Anglo-Saxon King of England and his brother Edmund Atheling and an allied army led by Olaf Guthfrithson, the Hiberno-Norse King of Dublin; Constantine II King of Scotland, and Owain ap Dyfnwal, the Welsh King of Strathclyde. The battle resulted in an overwhelming victory by King Æthelstan.

According to Egil's Saga by Snorri Sturluson, the saga's anti-hero, the Icelandic berserker, sorcerer, and poet Egill Skallagrímsson fought in the battle as an elite mercenary soldier for King Æthelstan. Egill is also said to have composed a drápa in honor of the King, which is quoted in full in the text of the Saga.

The Battle of Brunanburh is also celebrated by an Old English poem of the same name in the Anglo-Saxon Chronicle, which in 1880 was translated into modern English, in a metrical mixture of Trochees and dactyls, by Alfred Tennyson.

Muslim conquest of Armenia
Armenia's national epic, Sasna Tsrer (Daredevils of Sassoun), is set during the time of the invasion of Armenia by the Caliphate of Baghdad (about 670), and focuses on the resistance of four generations within the same family, which culminates with Armenian folk hero David of Sasun driving the Muslim invaders from Armenia.

It was collected and written down from the oral tradition by Fr. Garegin Srvandztiants, a celibate priest of the Armenian Apostolic Church, in 1873. The epic was first published in Constantinople in 1874. It is better known as Sasuntsi Davit ("David of Sasun").

Six decades later, Manuk Abeghian, a scholar of Armenian literature and folklore rendered an almost equally valuable service by collecting nearly all fifty variants of the epic in three scholarly volumes published by the State Publishing House in Yerevan, Soviet Armenia in 1936, 1944 (part l) and 1951 (part ll), under the general title Daredevils of Sasun. As the transcripts are in various dialects, which presents many difficulties to the modern reader, the story was reworded and a fairly uniform style comprehensible to Eastern Armenian speakers and readers was adopted.

All three volumes contain over 2,500 pages of text. In 1939 a collated text weaving most of the important episodes together was published for popular reading under the title "David of Sasun". From 1939 until 1966 all translations were made from this popularized text.

In 1964 Leon Zaven Surmelian, an Armenian-American poet, survivor, and memoirist of the Armenian genocide, chose a narrative from within all recorded versions, translated the epic into English, and published it under the name Daredevils of Sassoun. In his introduction, Surmelian sharply criticized the literary renderings of the epic published in Soviet Armenia. Surmelian denounced, among many other things, the fact that, due to both State Atheism and Censorship in the Soviet Union, "The religious element is played down."

During a visit to Yerevan prior to the publication of his treatment in the United States of America, Surmelian expressed these opinions to a Soviet Armenian writer and professor, who replied with a smile, "We may translate your English version into Armenian."

Viking Age

Egill Skallagrímsson
According to Egil's Saga by Snorri Sturluson, the saga's anti-hero, the Icelandic berserker, sorcerer, and poet Egill Skallagrímsson waged a blood-feud lasting many years against King Eiríkr Bloodaxe and Queen Gunnhildr.

The feud began when, after being grievously insulted, Egill killed Bárðr of Atley, a retainer of Eirikr and kinsman of Gunhildr. Seething with hatred, Gunnhildr ordered her two brothers, Eyvindr Braggart and Álfr Aksmann, to assassinate Egill and his brother Þórólfr, who had until then been on good terms with her. However, Egill slew the Queen's brothers when they attempted to confront him.

The following summer, Eirkr's father, King Haraldr Fairhair, died. To secure his place as sole King of Norway, Eiríkr Bloodaxe assassinated two of his own brothers and declared Egill an outlaw in Norway. Berg-Önundr gathered a posse to capture Egill, but Egill killed him while "resisting arrest". Before leaving Norway, Egill also slew Rögnvaldr, the son of King Eiríkr and Queen Gunnhildr. He then cursed the King and Queen by setting up a Nithing pole and saying
"Here I set up a níð-pole, and declare this níð against King Eiríkr and Queen Gunnhildr,"—he turned the horse-head to face the mainland—"I declare this níð at the land-spirits there, and the land itself, so that all will fare astray, not to hold nor find their places, not until they wreak King Eiríkr and Gunnhildr from the land." He set up the pole of níð in the cliff-face and left it standing; he faced the horse's eyes on the land, and he carved runes upon the pole, and said all the formal words of the curse. (ch. 57).

Both the King and Queen spent the remainder of their lives trying to take vengeance. Gunnhildr also put a spell on Egill, cursing him to feel restless and depressed until they meet again.

Soon afterwards, Eiríkr and Gunnhildr were defeated and overthrown by King Haakon the Good and were forced to flee to the Kingdom of Northumbria, in Saxon England. Eiríkr and Gunnhildr became King and Queen of Northumbria in rivalry with King Athelstan of England. In time, Egill was shipwrecked in Northumbria and came to know who ruled the land. Egill sought out the house of his good friend Arinbjörn, where they armed themselves and marched to Eiríkr's court. Arinbjörn tells Egill "Now you must go and offer the king your head and embrace his foot. I will present your case to him." Arinbjörn presents Egill's case and Egill composes a short drápa, reciting it with Eiríkr's foot in his hand, but Eiríkr was not impressed. He explained that Egill's many insults could not be forgiven and that Egill must lose his head. Gunnhildr also called for the immediate execution of Egill, but Arinbjörn convinced the king to wait until the morning.

Arinbjörn tells Egill that he should stay up all night and compose a mighty drápa, a poem in praise of his mortal enemy. In the morning Egill went again before King Eiríkr and recited the twenty-stanza long drápa Höfuðlausn, or "Head Ransom", which praises Eirkr's many victories in battle and appears in the full in Chapter 63 of Egils saga. Eiríkr was so impressed by the poem that he decided to grant Egill his life, even though Egill had killed Eiríkr's own son.

The Battle of Ethandune
G.K. Chesterton's 1911 poem The Ballad of the White Horse retells the story of the Battle of Ethandune, in which an army from the Anglo-Saxon Kingdom of Wessex led by King Alfred the Great defeated the Great Heathen Army led by King Guthrum of East-Anglia on a date between 6 and 12 May 878.

The Battle of Maldon
The Old English poem The Battle of Maldon, which survives only in an unfinished fragment, celebrates the battle of the same name. On 11 August, 991, Byrhtnoth, Ealdorman of the Kingdom of Essex, died at the head of his troops fighting against the invading crew of a Viking longship.

J.R.R. Tolkien's 1953 verse drama The Homecoming of Beorhtnoth Beorhthelm's Son depicts the events of the same Battle.

King Brian Boru
The Brussels Manuscript of the Cogad Gáedel re Gallaib, which is believed to have been written around 1635 by Franciscan friar and historian Mícheál Ó Cléirigh, contains many Irish war poems not found elsewhere. Like the other two surviving manuscripts, the Brussels Manuscript relates the wars between the Irish clans and the Norse and Danish invaders, and celebrates the ultimate rise to power of Brian Boru as High King of Ireland.

The Cogad alleges that as the Hiberno-Norse King Ivar of Limerick attempted to extend his power into Thomond, the Dál gCais Chief of the Name, Mathgamain mac Cennétig, and his younger brother, Brian Boru, "transported their people and chattels across the Shannon, westwards, where they dispersed themselves among the forests and woods of the country."

Mathgamain, who had defeated King Ivar and claimed the High Kingship of Munster at the Rock of Cashel, was captured and assassinated in 976 by Donnubán mac Cathail and Máel Muad mac Brain, who then reigned as King of Munster for the following two years.

Brian, the Tanist of his Clan, was so moved by news of his brother's assassination, that he is said to have publicly cried out and vowed vengeance.

Norman invasion of Ireland
The Song of Dermot and the Earl is an anonymous Anglo-Norman verse chronicle written in the early 13th century in England. It retells the 1170 invasion of Ireland by Diarmait Mac Murchada, the deposed Irish clan chief King of Leinster, and Strongbow in 1170 (the "earl" in the title), the wars that followed between the invaders and Haskulf Thorgilsson, the last Hiberno-Norse King of Dublin and Ruaidrí Ua Conchobair, the last High King of Ireland, and the subsequent visit to Ireland by King Henry II of England in 1172.

The chronicle survived only in a single manuscript which was re-discovered in the 17th century at Lambeth Palace in London. The manuscript bears no title, but has been commonly dubbed The Song of Dermot and the Earl since Goddard Henry Orpen published a diplomatic edition under this title in 1892.

Kievan Rus'
The Tale of Igor's Campaign (Слово о пълкѹ Игоревѣ), an epic poem in Old East Slavic, describes a failed raid made in the year 1185 by an army led by Prince Igor Svyatoslavich of Novgorod-Seversk (in the Chernigov principality of Kievan Rus' in modern Ukraine) against the Polovtsians (Cumans), Pagan Turkic nomads living along the southern banks of the Don River.

The Prince and his warriors witnessed the Solar eclipse of 1 May 1185, which was interpreted by the Rus' warriors as a message from the Christian God and as a very, very bad omen. According to The Lay, Prince Igor gave a long speech to his warriors and managed to allay their fears.

The poem then goes on to relate how the Prince's army was catastrophically defeated in battle by the Cumans upon the banks of the Don River and how only fifteen Rus' warriors were spared. The Cumans then went on a massive retaliatory invasion of Kievan Rus'. Meanwhile, Prince Igor and his son were the personal prisoners of Khan Konchak. Although closely guarded by his captors, Prince Igor was permitted considerable freedom and was allowed to hunt with a falcon. Ultimately, the Prince escaped with the assistance of one of his Cuman guards and returned to Christendom, to the joy of all the people of Kievan Rus'.

The poem ends there, but the Prince's son, Vladimir III Igorevich, who had entered into an arranged marriage with the Khan's daughter, returned a few years later with Princess Svoboda, his Cuman bride. The Khan's daughter was baptized and their marriage was solemnized in a Byzantine Rite ceremony conducted in Old Church Slavonic.

Many other historical figures are mentioned, including skald Boyan (The Bard), Princes Vseslav of Polotsk, Yaroslav Osmomysl of Halych, and Vsevolod the Big Nest of Suzdal. While drawing upon the otherwise lost tradition of war poetry in Slavic paganism, the poem's unnamed author appeals to the warring Christian Princes of Kievan Rus' and pleads with them to unite against the constant raids, murders, pillage, and enslavement of their subjects by the Pagan Turkic tribes from the steppe.

Since its 18th century rediscovery in a 15th-century manuscript from Yaroslavl and 1800 publication by Aleksei Musin-Pushkin, The Lay, which has often been compared with The Song of Roland and the Nibelungenlied, has inspired other poems, art, music, and the opera Prince Igor by Alexander Borodin. It is claimed by Russians, Belarusians, and Ukrainians as a national epic.

As the main characters of the poem came from modern Ukraine, The Lay has had a massive influence on Ukrainian literature. For example, Ukraine's national poet, Taras Shevchenko, used the "Lament of Yaroslavna" from the Lay of Igor as the basis for several poems of his own. Subsequent Ukrainian poets such as Markian Shashkevych and Bogdan Lepky have followed Shevchenko's example. Lepky is particularly well known for his 1905 translation of The Lay into Polish.

The Lay also captured the imagination of the intelligentsia during the Golden Age of Russian Poetry and has had a major influence on Russian literature and culture. Romantic poet Vasily Zhukovsky published a translation of The Lay into modern Russian in 1819. At the time of his 1837 death from wounds received in a duel, Russia's national poet, Alexander Pushkin, was planning to translate the epic from Old East Slavic into modern Russian and left detailed notes behind of his plans for the project. Pushkin's notes were later used by Nikolay Zabolotsky, who translated The Lay while imprisoned in the Gulag at Karaganda, and for this reason Zablotsky's translation remains the most popular.

In 1904, Austrian poet Rainer Maria Rilke translated The Lay into German. Rilke's translation was posthumously published in 1930.

The Lay has also been translated into English literally by Vladimir Nabokov, Dmitri Likhachev, and Serge Zenkovsky, and also into the original dactylic meter in a collaboration between Canadian poets Constantine Andrushyshen and Watson Kirkconnell.

The Edwardian Conquest of Wales
After the conquest of Wales by King Edward I of England and the death of Prince Llywelyn ap Gruffudd, who is often called "Llewellyn the Last," during an unsuccessful uprising in 1282, the Welsh poet Gruffudd ab yr Ynad Coch wrote in an elegy:

Do you not see the path of the wind and the rain?
Do you not see the oak trees in turmoil?

Cold my heart in a fearful breast
For the king, the oaken door of Aberffraw

Hungarian poet János Arany's 1857 ballad A walesi bárdok ("The Bards of Wales") retells the legend of three Welsh bards who were summoned before King Edward I to sing his praises at Montgomery Castle in 1277. Instead, all three Bards not only refuses to sing the King's praises, but also tell him that the Welsh people will never forget or forgive the atrocities Edward has committed nor the deaths of the many Welshmen who died resisting the conquest.

After the third Bard vows that no Welsh Bard lives who will ever sing his praises, the furious King orders his retainers to hunt down every Bard in Wales and to burn them all at the stake. The ballad then relates that 500 Welsh Bards were arrested and burned to death and that all refused to save their lives by praising the English King.

The poem ends with King Edward the Longshanks back in London and being tormented by nightmares in which the 500 Bards continue singing about his crimes against their country and the Welsh people's everlasting hatred for his name.

The poem, which Arany got past the censors by claiming that it was a translation of a Medieval English ballad, is a veiled attack against Emperor Franz Joseph for the defeat of the Hungarian Revolution of 1848. It is considered an immortal work of Hungarian literature.

The best-known English translation was done by Canadian poet Watson Kirkconnell, who rendered Arany's poem into the same meter and idiom as the Child Ballads, in 1933. In September 2007 an English copy of this poem, translated by Peter Zollman, was donated to the National Library of Wales in Aberystwyth. The most recent translation has been made by Hungarian-American poet Erika Papp Faber.

The 1982 Bardic Chair at the National Eisteddfod of Wales was awarded to Gerallt Lloyd Owen for the awdl Cilmeri, which Hywel Teifi Edwards has called the only 20th century awdl, that matches T. Gwynn Jones' 1902 masterpiece Umadawiad Arthur ("The Passing of Arthur"). Owen's Cilmeri reimagines the death of Prince Llywelyn ap Gruffudd of the Royal House of Gwynedd in battle near the village of the same name in 1282, while leading a doomed uprising against the occupation of Wales by King Edward I of England. Owen's poem depicts the Prince as a tragic hero and invests his fall with an anguish unmatched since Gruffudd ab yr Ynad Coch wrote his famous lament for the Prince immediately following his death. Owen also, according to Edwards, encapsulates in the Prince's death the Welsh people's continuing "battle for national survival."

The Scottish Wars of Independence
In 1375, Scottish Makar, or court poet, John Barbour completed the epic poem The Brus, which retells and celebrates the deeds of Robert the Bruce, who led the Scottish people in their Wars of Independence against Kings Edward I and Edward II of England and who ultimately became King of Scotland.

Around 1488, fellow Scottish Makar Blind Harry wrote the epic poem The Wallace, about the life and death of iconic Scottish nationalist Sir William Wallace.

The events of the Scottish Wars of Independence are also a regular theme in the verse of Scotland's national poet, Robert Burns.

The Battle of Kulikovo
The 15th century poem Zadonschina, which draws upon the same tradition of Pre-Christian Slavic war poetry as The Tale of Igor, was composed to glorify the victory of Dmitri Donskoi, Great Prince of Moscow over Mamai and the Mongols of the Golden Horde at the Battle of Kulikovo along the Don River on 8 September 1380. The poem survives in six medieval manuscripts.

The author of Zadonshchina is believed to have been a certain Sofonii (Russian: Софоний) from Ryazan’. His name as the author of the text is mentioned in two surviving manuscript copies. Sofonii was probably one of the courtiers of Vladimir the Bold, a cousin of Great Prince Dmitri Donskoi, the hero of the poem.

The War of the League of Cambrai

The Battle of Flodden on 9 September 1513, in which an English army led by the Earl of Surrey defeated and killed King James IV of Scotland and gave no quarter to an estimated 12,000 nobles and commons recruited from both the Scottish Highlands and Lowlands, is sometimes considered the end of the Middle Ages in the British Isles.

Even though King James was married to Margaret Tudor, the sister of King Henry VIII of England, the Scottish King's torn and bloodstained surcoat was sent as a trophy of war to King Henry, who was then invading France, by his wife, Queen Catherine of Aragon.

The battle remains one of Scotland's horrific military defeats. The loss not only of the King, but also a large portion of the nobles, commons and princes of the Church, was a catastrophe for the kingdom. King James IV's one-year-old son, James V, was crowned a mere three weeks after the death of his father, and his childhood was to prove fraught with political upheaval.

By far the most famous war poem about the battle is the poem in Scots, The Flowers of the Forest by Lady  Jean Elliot.

According to legend, Lady Jean was riding in the family coach one night during the 1750s when her brother Gilbert allegedly wagered a pair of gloves or set of ribbons that his sister could not write a ballad about the Battle of Flodden Field. When her brother saw the finished poem, he knew, 'that he had lost his wager and Scotland had gained a ballad which would never die.'

In 1755, Lady Jean published the lyrics anonymously and The Flowers of the Forest was at first thought to be an ancient ballad. However, Robert Burns suspected it was an imitation, and together with Ramsay and Sir Walter Scott eventually identified the author.

In his song The Green Fields of France, which denounces the waste of an entire generation of young men in the trenches of the First World War, Eric Bogle also savages the custom of playing Lady Jean's ballad on the Great Highland bagpipes during British and Commonwealth military funerals. Ironically, The Flowers of the Forest is every bit as much of an anti-war song as anything by Eric Bogle, Bob Dylan, or Joan Baez.

Even though King James IV is widely considered the most popular and effective Scottish monarch of the House of Stuart, The Flowers of the Forest holds him personally responsible for the War of the League of Cambrai and the resulting slaughter of thousands of Scottish Highlanders and Lowlanders at Flodden.

The song, which in Scots is known as The Floo'ers o' the Forest (are a' wede away), graphically describes the bottomless loneliness of the peasant women in Scottish villages after the battle, as there were no men left alive to woo or to marry them. The lyrics also describe the grief of all the widows and the "bairns" (children), who have been left fatherless.

The song's title and lyrics particularly laments the slaughter at Flodden of the famous archers of Ettrick Forest, Selkirkshire, whose forbears were dubbed the "Flowers of the Forest" after they fell fighting under Sir William Wallace and Sir John Stewart at the Battle of Falkirk in 1298. At Flodden, the archers of Ettrick formed the personal bodyguard of King James IV and, just like their forbears at Falkirk, their corpses were all found surrounding their fallen lord.

The Siege of Szigetvár

The 1566 Battle of Szigetvár, in which a vastly outnumbered army of 2,300 Croatian and Hungarian soldiers in service to the Habsburg monarchy and under the command of Nikola IV Zrinski, the Ban of Croatia, defended the Hungarian fortress of the same name against an enormous Ottoman army under the command of Sultan Suleiman the Magnificent, has thrice been made the subject of epic poetry.

Historically, the Battle of Szigetvár concluded shortly after the death of the Sultan from natural causes inside his tent. In response, the Grand Vizier of the Ottoman Empire, a Serbian Orthodox convert to Islam named Sokollu Mehmed Pasha, secretly executed all witnesses to the Sultan's death and concealed it to keep the Army's morale from breaking. Soon after, on 7 September 1566, Captain Zrinski's forces, having been greatly depleted, opened the fortress gates and rode out in a ferocious onslaught.

Approximately six hundred Hungarian and Croatian soldiers charged with sabers flying into the Turkish camp. During a counter-attack led by Sokollu Mehmed Pasha, Nikola Zrinski was struck down by two gunshots in the chest and an arrow to the face. He is said to have died smiling, possibly thinking of the one last surprise he had left behind for the Turks. As Turkish janissaries poured into the fortress, a slow-burning fuse set off a massive explosion in the gunpowder magazine. The fortress of Szigetvár and more than 3,000 Turkish soldiers were blown to bits, in addition to the nearly 30,000 Turks who had already fallen during the Siege.

Even though the Grand Vizier claimed victory, the campaign, which had planned to besiege and capture Vienna, ended after the deaths of both Zrinski and the Sultan and the Army retreated to Belgrade, where Selim II, the son of Suleiman the Magnificent and Hurrem Sultan, was acclaimed as Sultan of the Ottoman Empire. Meanwhile, Nikola Zrinski was acclaimed as a hero throughout Christendom. Cardinal Richelieu, the Minister of State to King Louis XIII of France, famously described the Siege of Szigetvár as "the battle that saved civilization". Nikola Zrinski remains a national hero in both Croatia and Hungary and is often portrayed in artworks.

The first epic poem about the Siege was composed in Croatian by the poet Brne Karnarutić of Zadar, titled Vazetje Sigeta grada (English: The Taking of the City of Siget), and posthumously published at Venice in 1584. Karnarutić is known to have based his account very heavily on the memoirs of Zrinski's valet, Franjo Črnko. Karnarutić is known to have drawn further inspiration from Marko Marulić's Judita.

In 1651, Hungarian poet Miklós Zrínyi, the great-grandson of Nikola Zrinski, published the epic poem Szigeti veszedelem ("The Siege of Sziget").

Choosing to model his work on Homer's Iliad and Torquato Tasso's Gerusalemme Liberata, Zrínyi opens his poem with an invocation to the Muse (the Virgin Mary), and often features characters from Greek mythology; Cupid even appears and Captain Zrinski is several times compared to Hector in the text.

According to Encyclopædia Britannica Online, The Siege of Sziget is "the first epic poem in Hungarian literature" and "one of the major works of Hungarian literature". Kenneth Clark's Civilisation describes Szigeti veszedelem as one of the major literary achievements of the 17th century. Even though John Milton's Paradise Lost is often credited with resurrecting Classical epic poetry, Milton's poem was published in 1667, sixteen years after Zrínyi's Szigeti Veszedelem.

Zrinyí's epic concludes with Nikola Zrinski personally killing the Sultan and then being gunned down by Turkish janissaries. However, most historians accept the Turkish sources which state that the Sultan died of natural causes in his tent before the final assault and that his death was kept secret to keep his army's morale from breaking.

Four translations are known to have been completed. The work was immediately translated into Croatian by Miklós's brother Petar Zrinski, who is mentioned in the fourteenth chapter of the epic, under the title of Opsida Sigecka. This version's original 1652 printing also proved to be its last for a long period of time. The only surviving copy was held by the Croatian central library in Zagreb, until a new edition was published by Matica hrvatska in 2016. German and Italian translations were produced in the late 1800s and in 1908. A new German translation was published in Budapest in 1944; the translator, Árpád Guilleaume, was an officer in the Royal Hungarian Army during World War II, and his work was later banned after the war by the Communist People's Republic of Hungary. In 2011, an English translation by László Kőrössy was published by Catholic University of America in Washington, D.C., and is still currently in print.

Another Croatian nobleman warrior-poet Pavao Ritter Vitezović (1652–1713) wrote about the Battle. His poem Odiljenje sigetsko ("The Sziget Farewell"), first published in 1684, reminisces about the event without rancour or crying for revenge. The last of the four cantos is titled "Tombstones" and consists of epitaphs for the Croatian and Turkish warriors who died during the siege, paying equal respect to both.

The Battle of Lepanto
The Spanish novelist and poet Miguel de Cervantes served in combat during the Battle of Lepanto in 1571 and later retold his experiences in the sonnet form.

G.K. Chesterton retold the story of the same battle in his poem Lepanto, which was written in 1911 and published in 1915.

The Thirty Years War

The Thirty Years War, which took place largely within the Holy Roman Empire from 1618 to 1648, caused between 4.5 and 8 million deaths, while some areas of Germany experienced population decreases of more than 50%. It remains one of the most destructive wars in European history

In her book The Real Personage of Mother Goose, author Katherine Elwes Thomas alleges that the English nursery rhyme The Queen of Hearts is about the events that caused the outbreak of the Thirty Years War. The King and Queen of Hearts are, according to Elwes Thomas, a thinly disguised description of Elector Palatine Friedrich V and his wife Elizabeth Stuart. The Queen's decision to bake tarts refers to her persuasion of her Calvinist husband to accept the Czech nobility's offer of the throne of the Kingdom of Bohemia, after the local officials of "The Knave of Hearts", the Holy Roman Emperor Ferdinand II, were overthrown in a palace coup known as the Third Defenestration of Prague.

After accepting the offer, Friedrich and Elizabeth reigned as King and Queen of Bohemia until their defeat at the Battle of White Mountain on 8 November 1620 – only a year and four days after their coronation. Imperial soldiers then invaded Friedrich's ancestral lands along the Rhine and drove him and his family into exile in the Dutch Republic. Elector Palatine Friedrich V and his heirs were then attainted in a decree by the Holy Roman Emperor and continued to live in exile. Friedrich and Elizabeth's son was restored to the Electoral Throne of the Palatinate only after the war was ended by the Peace of Westphalia in 1648.

In German poetry, the Baroque anti-war sonnets of Andreas Gryphius, a Lutheran pastor's son from Silesia, remain well known. Gryphius made many enemies for himself by denouncing the destruction, suffering, and needless civilian casualties left behind by the private armies of both sides in both verse form and in prose.

Gryphius's first collection of poems, Sonnete ("Sonnets"), was published in 1637 by Wigand Funck in Lissa, and is accordingly known as the Lissaer Sonettbuch, after the town. The collection of 31 sonnets includes some of his best known poems, such as "Vanitas vanitatum, et omnia vanitas", later titled "Es ist alles eitel" (All is vanity), about the effects of war and the transitoriness of human life; "Menschliches Elende" (Human misery); and "Trawrklage des verwüsteten Deutschlandes" (Lament of a Devastated Germany).

In 1632, Gryphius had witnessed the pillaging and burning of the Silesian town of Freystadt by the Protestant troops of King Gustavus Adolphus of Sweden. Gryphius immortalized the sack of the city in a detailed eyewitness account titled Fewrige Freystadt, which made him many enemies.

The Jacobite Uprising of 1715
In the song Là Sliabh an t-Siorraim, Sìleas na Ceapaich, the daughter of the 15th Chief of Clan MacDonald of Keppoch, sings of the joy upon the arrival of Prince James Francis Edward Stuart, the indecisive Battle of Sheriffmuir and the state of uneasy anticipation between the battle and the end of the Jacobite rising of 1715.

The most iconic poem by Sìleas, however, inspired by the events of the Uprising was only completed many years later. When Ailean Dearg, the Chief of Clan Macdonald of Clanranald had been mortally wounded at the Battle of Sherrifmuir, Alasdair Dubh, 11th Chief of Clan MacDonald of Glengarry rallied the faltering warriors of Clan Donald by throwing up his Highland bonnet and crying Buillean an-diugh, tuiream a-màireach! ("Blows today, mourning tomorrow!"). Following Alasdair Dubh's death (c. 1721 or 1724), he was eulogized by Sìleas in the song-poem Alistair à Gleanna Garadh, which hearkens back to the mythological poetry attributed to Amergin Glúingel and which remains an iconic and oft imitated work of Scottish Gaelic literature.

Jacobite Uprising of 1745

In Scottish Gaelic literature, the greatest war poet of the Jacobite rising of 1745 is Alasdair Mac Mhaighstir Alasdair, a tacksman from the Clanranald branch of Clan Donald.

Jacobite songs penned by Alasdair such as: Òran Nuadh – "A New Song", Òran nam Fineachan Gaidhealach – "The Song of the Highland Clans" and Òran do'n Phrionnsa – "A Song to the Prince," serve as testament to the Bard's passionate loyalty to the House of Stuart. According to literary historian John MacKenzie, these poems were sent to Aeneas MacDonald, the brother of the Clanranald tacksman of Kinlochmoidart, who was a banker in Paris. Aeneas read the poems aloud to Prince Charles Edward Stuart in English translation and the poems played a major role in convincing the Prince to come to Scotland and to initiate the Jacobite Rising of 1745.

Alasdair served as the Prince's tutor in Gaelic and as a captain of the Clanranald men from the raising of the Standard at Glenfinnan until the final defeat at the Battle of Culloden.

Other poems about the Uprising were written in both Gaelic and English by John Roy Stewart, who served as colonel of the Edinburgh Regiment and a close and trusted confidant of Prince Charles Edward Stuart.

The Irish poem Mo Ghile Mear, which was composed by the County Cork Bard Seán "Clárach" Mac Domhnaill, is a lament for the defeat of the Uprising at the Battle of Culloden. The poem is a soliloquy by the Kingdom of Ireland, whom Seán Clárach personifies, according to the rules of the Aisling genre, as a woman from the Otherworld. The woman laments her state and describes herself as a grieving widow due to the defeat and exile of her lawful King.

Since being popularised by Sean O Riada, Mo Ghile Mear has become one of the most popular Irish songs ever written. It has been recorded by The Chieftains, Mary Black, Muireann Nic Amhlaoibh, Sting, Sibéal, and many other artists.

The Scottish Gaelic song Mo rùn geal òg ("My fair young love"), alternately known as Cumha do dh'Uilleam Siseal ("The Lament for William Chisholm") is a lament composed by Christina Fergusson for her husband, William Chisholm of Strathglass.

Fergusson was possibly born in Contin, Ross-shire. She was married to William Chisholm, who was a blacksmith, armourer and standard bearer for the Chief of Clan Chisholm. Chisholm was killed in action on 16 April 1746, while bearing the standard of his Clan at the Battle of Culloden. In his memory, Ferguson wrote Mo Rùn Geal Òg (My Fair Young Love). In the poem, Christina Fergusson rebukes Prince Charles Edward Stuart, saying that the loss of her husband in the fight for his cause has left her desolate.

The song has since been recorded by Flora MacNeil, Karen Matheson, and Julie Fowlis.

Poems about the Jacobite rising of 1745 have also been written in English by Sir Walter Scott, Carolina Nairne, Agnes Maxwell MacLeod, Allan Cunningham, and William Hamilton.

However, even as the British upper class and the literary world were romanticizing the Uprising and the culture of the Scottish clans, the suppression of Highland Scottish culture, which had begun after the rising's defeat, continued for nearly two centuries afterward.

For example, under to the 1872 Education Act, school attendance was compulsory and only English was taught or tolerated in the schools of both the Lowlands and the Highlands and Islands. As a result, any student who spoke Scots or Scottish Gaelic in the school or on its grounds could expect what Ronald Black calls the, "familiar Scottish experience of being thrashed for speaking [their] native language."

Before serving in the Seaforth Highlanders in British India and during the Fall of France in 1940, Gaelic-language war poet Aonghas Caimbeul attended the 300-pupil Cross School on the Isle of Lewis after the 1872 Education Act. He later recalled, "A Lowlander, who had not a word of Gaelic, was the schoolmaster. I never had a Gaelic lesson in school, and the impression you got was that your language, people, and tradition had come from unruly, wild, and ignorant tribes and that if you wanted to make your way in the world you would be best to forget them completely. Short of the stories of the German Baron Münchhausen, I have never come across anything as dishonest, untruthful, and inaccurate as the history of Scotland as taught in those days."

Even so, large numbers of the Scottish people, both Highlander and Lowlander, continued to enlist in the British armed forces and Scottish regiments becoming renowned worldwide as shock troops.

For this reason, literary critic Wilson MacLeod has written that, in post-Culloden Scottish Gaelic literature, anti-colonialist poets such as Duncan Livingstone "must be considered isolated voices. The great majority of Gaelic verse, from the eighteenth century onwards, was steadfastly Pro-British and Pro-Empire, with several poets, including Aonghas Moireasdan and Dòmhnall MacAoidh, enthusiastically asserting the conventual justificatory rationale for imperial expansion, that it was a civilising mission rather than a process of conquest and expropriation. Conversely, there is no evidence that Gaelic poets saw a connection between their own difficult history and the experience of colonised people in other parts of the world."

American Revolution
Henry Wadsworth Longfellow's 1860 poem Paul Revere's Ride both retells and fictionalizes the efforts of Boston silversmith Paul Revere to warn Patriot militia of an imminent attack by the British Army on the night before the Battles of Lexington and Concord in April 1775. Longfellow's poem was first published in the January 1861 issue of The Atlantic Monthly and later included as part of Longfellow's 1863 poetry collection Tales of a Wayside Inn.

Ralph Waldo Emerson's 1837 poem Concord Hymn pays tribute to the Patriot militia at the Battle of Concord and famously says that they fired, "The shot heard round the world."

David Humphreys wrote the first sonnet in American poetry in 1776, right before he left Yale College to fight as a colonel in the Continental Army during the American Revolutionary War. Colonel Humphreys' sonnet was titled Addressed to my Friends at Yale College, on my leaving them to join the Army.

Among the "earliest Scottish Gaelic poets in North America about whom we know anything", is Kintail-born Iain mac Mhurchaidh, a poet from Clan Macrae, who emigrated to Moore County in the Colony of North Carolina around 1774, fought as a Loyalist during the American Revolution, and composed Gaelic war poetry there until his death around 1780.

According to tradition he fought as a Loyalist under the command of Major Patrick Ferguson at the Battle of King's Mountain on October 7, 1780. Although this battle has traditionally, "been characterized as a confrontation between Loyalist Highlanders and Scotch-Irish revolutionaries", there were in reality Gaelic-speakers fighting on both sides. According to one source, Iain mac Mhuirchaidh, in a revival of, "the diplomatic immunity of the ancient Celtic bards", walked between the opposing armies during the battle and, in an attempt to convert his fellow Gaels among the Patriot militia and the Overmountain Men, he sang the song, Nam faighte làmh-an-uachdar air luchd nan còta ruadha ("Even if the upper hand were gained against the Redcoats"). In the poem, Iain mac Mhurchaidh called the American Revolution against King George every bit as unnatural as disrespect against one's earthly or heavenly father. He also threatened that Patriots who did not submit to the British Monarchy would be treated like both real and suspected Jacobites had been treated in the aftermath of the Battle of Culloden, which is still referred to in the Highlands and Islands as Bliadhna nan Creach ("The Year of the Pillaging").

In may well have been in retaliation for this very poem that, according to one tradition, Iain mac Mhurchaidh, subsequently, "suffered an excruciating death", at Patriot hands.

In 1783, the year that saw the end of the American Revolution and the beginning of the Highland Clearances in Inverness-shire, Cionneach MacCionnich (1758–1837), a poet from Clan MacKenzie who was born at Castle Leather near Inverness, composed the only surviving Gaelic poem of the era which takes up the Patriot, rather than the Loyalist, banner - The Lament of the North. In the poem, MacCionnich mocks the Scottish clan chiefs for becoming absentee landlords, for both rackrenting and evicting their clansmen en masse in favor of sheep, and of "spending their wealth uselessly", in London. He accuses King George III of England both of tyranny and of steering the ship of state into shipwreck. MacCionnich also argues that truth is on the side of George Washington and the Continental Army and that the Gaels would do well to emigrate from the Highlands and Islands to the United States before the King and the landlords take every farthing they have left.

Ali Pashiad
During the early 19th century, Albanian Muslim bard Haxhi Shehreti composed the epic poem Alipashiad. The work is inspired by and named after Ali Pasha, the governor of the Pashalik of Ioannina in Ottoman Greece, describing, in heroic style, his life, and his military campaigns. The poem is written in Demotic Greek, which Shehreti considered a far more prestigious language than Turkish or Albanian. Historically, the Alipashiad is unique in Greek poetry due to its having been written from an Islamic point of view.

The Alipashiad, which consists of 15,000 lines, was written in the early 19th century, when Ali Pasha was at his height as the semi-independent ruler of much of Ottoman Greece.

Apart from describing Ali's adventures the poem describes Ioannina, which was a center of Greek culture and renaissance that time, as well as the activities of the local mercenaries (Armatoles) and revolutionaries (Klephts) that Ali had to deal with.

According to the Encyclopedia of Islam, however, after his 1820 outlawry and 1822 death while leading an uprising against Sultan Mahmud II of the Ottoman Empire, Ali Pasha became, in Western literature, the personification of an "oriental despot".

The Greek War of Independence
The Greek War of Independence raged from 1821 to 1830 and which resulted in the independence of the Greek people after more than four hundred years of rule by the Ottoman Empire. The uprising and its many predecessors also produced many great composers of war poetry.

In English poetry, Lord Byron, who had fled England ahead of legal proceedings being filed by his many creditors and immediately following the very public breakup of his marriage to Lady Byron, is by far the most famous of these poets. Byron travelled to Greece during the fighting and joined the Greek rebels. Byron also glorified the Greek cause in many of his poems, which continued to be widely read. In 1824, Byron died at the age of 36 from a fever contracted after the First and Second Siege of Missolonghi. To this day, the Greek people revere him as a national hero.

Even though he was strangled inside Nebojša Tower in Belgrade by order of Sultan Selim III of the House of Osman in 1798 while planning a Greek uprising with the assistance of Napoleon Bonaparte, the nationalist verse of Rigas Feraios (1757–1798) helped inspire the Greek War of Independence and he remains a major figure in Greek poetry. In his poems, Feraios urged the Greek people to leave the cities for the mountains and to fight in the mountains to gain their independence.

Feraios' last words are said to have been: "I have sown a rich seed; the hour is coming when my country will reap its glorious fruits".

Dionysios Solomos (1798–1857), another poet of the Greek War of Independence, wrote the Hymn to Liberty, which is now the Greek national anthem, in 1823, just two years after the Greeks rose against the Ottoman Empire.It is also the national anthem of Cyprus, which adopted it in 1966. Solomon's is considered to be the national poet of Greece.

To this day, many songs are sung worldwide on 25 March by members of the Greek diaspora to celebrate Greek independence and showcase their respect for the many Greek lives that were lost during the more four hundred years of Ottoman rule.

German Revolutions of 1848–49
Georg Herwegh who wrote during the German revolutions of 1848–49 is an example of a 19th-century German war poet.

Hungarian Revolution of 1848

The Hungarian Revolution of 1848 was, in large part, inspired by the poetry of Sándor Petőfi, who is still considered Hungary's national poet.

The uprising began on 15 March 1848, when Petőfi read his poem Nemzeti Dal ("National Song") aloud on the steps of the Hungarian National Museum in Budapest. The poem triggered a massive demonstration in the streets of the city, which forced the Emperor's representatives to accept the end of censorship and the release of all political prisoners.

The Revolution eventually resulted in a civil war between a Hungarian Republican Government led by Lajos Kossuth and Hungarian Monarchists, many of whom were ethnic minorities, who remained loyal to the House of Hapsburg. In response, Tsar Nicholas I of Russia, who had been raised on stories of the French Revolution and the Reign of Terror, ordered the Imperial Russian Army to enter Hungary and to ally themselves with the monarchists.

Despite efforts by General Józef Bem to keep him out of danger, Petőfi insisted on going into combat against the Monarchists and their Russian allies. Petőfi is believed to have either been killed in action during the Battle of Segesvár on 31 July 1849, or to have subsequently died in a Tsarist penal colony near Barguzin, in Siberia. At the time of his presumed death, Petőfi was only 26 years old.

Despite the defeat of the uprising, Petőfi's poetry and nostalgia for the 1848 Revolution have become a major part of Hungary's national identity.

 
According to Reg Gadney, the anti-communist Hungarian Revolution of 1956 began on 23 October 1956, when 20,000 student protesters gathered around the statue of Sándor Petőfi on the Pest side of the Danube River. During the gathering, Nemzeti Dal was recited to the demonstrators by Imre Sinkovics, a young actor from the Budapest National Theater. The demonstrators then read out a list of sixteen demands to the Communist Government of Hungary, laid wreaths at the foot of the statue, and crossed the Danube to Buda, where the demonstration continued before the statue of General Józef Bem.

Like Petőfi's first reading of the poem on 15 March 1848, the demonstration grew into a city-wide affair, and then into a temporarily successful nationwide uprising against the existing regime, which was only quelled by the intervention of the Russian Army.

Crimean War
Probably the most famous 19th-century war poem is Tennyson's "The Charge of the Light Brigade", which he supposedly wrote in only a few minutes after reading an account of the battle in The Times. As poet laureate, he often wrote verses about public events. It immediately became hugely popular, even reaching the troops in the Crimea, where it was distributed in pamphlet form.

Rudyard Kipling's poem "The Last of the Light Brigade", written some forty years after the appearance of "The Charge of the Light Brigade", in 1891, focuses on the terrible hardships faced in old age by veterans of the Crimean War, as exemplified by the cavalry men of the Light Brigade, in an attempt to shame the British public into offering financial assistance. Various lines from the poem are randomly quoted by Mr. Ramsay in Virginia Woolf's To The Lighthouse.

American Civil War

As the American Civil War was beginning, American poet Walt Whitman published his poem "Beat! Beat! Drums!" as a patriotic rally call for the North. Whitman volunteered for a time as a nurse in the army hospitals, and his collection  Drum-Taps (1865) deals with his experiences during the War.

Novelist Herman Melville also wrote many poems about the war which support the Union side.

On 18 July 1863, Die Minnesota-Staats-Zeitung, a newspaper published by and for German-speaking Forty-Eighters living in Minnesota, printed An die Helden des Ersten Minnesota Regiments ("To the Heroes of the First Minnesota Regiment"), a work of German poetry in tribute to the Union soldiers of the 1st Minnesota Infantry Regiment and their iconic charge from Cemetery Ridge during the second day of the Battle of Gettysburg. The poet was G. A. Erdman of Hastings, Minnesota.

Also during the American Civil War, Edward Thomas, a Welsh-language poet from Centerville, Ohio, and whose Bardic name was Awenydd, enlisted in Company E of the 2nd Minnesota Cavalry Regiment. During his service in that Regiment, Thomas wrote many Welsh poems, including Pryddest ar Wir Fawredd, which later won the Bardic Crown at an Eisteddfod held in Minersville, Pennsylvania. After the end of the war, Thomas became a Presbyterian minister.

On the Confederate side, the most well known Civil War poet is Father Abram Ryan, a Roman Catholic priest and former military chaplain to the Confederate Army. Father Ryan, who eulogized the defeated South in poems like The Conquered Banner and The Sword of Lee, is sometimes referred to as "The Poet-Priest of the Confederacy," and as "The Poet Laureate of the South."

Boer War
Rudyard Kipling wrote poetry in support of the British cause in the Boer War, including the well known "Lichtenberg", which is about a combatant's death in a foreign land. Swinburne, Thomas Hardy, and others wrote also poems relating to the Boer War. Hardy's poems include "Drummer Hodge", and "The Man He Killed". '"Swinburne regularly donated work to the papers to rouse the spirit, from 'Transvaal', with the infamous closing line, 'Strike, England, and strike home', to 'The Turning of the Tide'."

During the last phase of the war in the former Orange Free State, the Afrikaner people of Winburg taunted the Scottish regiments in the local British Army garrison with a parody of the Jacobite ballad Bonnie Dundee, which was generally sung in English. The parody celebrated the guerrilla warfare of Boer Commando leader Christiaan De Wet.

 De Wet he is mounted, he rides up the street
 The English skedaddle an A1 retreat!
 And the commander swore: They've got through the net
 That's been spread with such care for Christiaan De Wet.

 There are hills beyond Winburg and Boers on each hill
 Sufficient to thwart ten generals' skill
 There are stout-hearted burghers 10,000 men set
 On following the Mausers of Christian De Wet.

 Then away to the hills, to the veld, to the rocks
 Ere we own a usurper we'll crouch with the fox
 And tremble false Jingoes amidst all your glee
 Ye have not seen the last of my Mausers and me!

World War I

In a 2020 article for the St Austin Review about American WWI poet John Allan Wyeth, Dana Gioia writes, "The First World War changed European literature forever. The horror of modern mechanized warfare and the slaughter of nineteen million young men and innocent civilians traumatized the European imagination. For poets, the unprecedented scale of violence annihilated the classic traditions of war literature – individual heroism, military glory, and virtuous leadership. Writers struggled for a new idiom commensurate with their apocalyptic personal experience. European Modernism emerged from the trenches of the Western Front.

"British poetry especially was transformed by the trauma of trench warfare and indiscriminate massacre. The 'War Poets' constitute an imperative presence in modern British literature with significant writers such as Wilfred Owen, Robert Graves, Siegfried Sassoon, David Jones, Ivor Gurney, Rupert Brooke, Edward Thomas, and Isaac Rosenberg. Their work, which combined stark realism and bitter irony with a sense of tragic futility, altered the history of English literature.

"Similar cohorts of war poets occupy important positions in other European literature's. French literature has Charles Peguy, Guillaume Apollinaire, and Blaise Cendrars (who lost his right arm at the Second Battle of Champagne). Italian poetry has Eugenio Montale, Giuseppe Ungaretti, and Gabriele D'Annunzio. German poetry has Georg Trakl, August Stramm, and Gottfried Benn.

"These scarred survivors reshaped the sensibility of modern verse. The Great War also changed literature in another brutal way; it killed countless young writers."

Serbia
Serbian World War I poets include: Milutin Bojić, Vladislav Petković Dis, Miloš Crnjanski, Dušan Vasiljev, Ljubomir Micić, Proka Jovkić, Rastko Petrović, Stanislav Vinaver, Branislav Milosavljević, Milosav Jelić, Vladimir Stanimirović. and others.

Austria-Hungary

There were also war poets from the Austro-Hungarian Empire.

Géza Gyóni, a Hungarian poet with twin beliefs in socialism and anti-militarism, had unhappily served in the Austro-Hungarian Army prior to the outbreak of war in 1914. In response, Gyóni had written the great pacifist poem, Cézar, én nem megyek ("Caesar, I Will Not Go").

But after the police investigation into the assassination of Archduke Franz Ferdinand revealed the involvement of Serbian Army military intelligence chief Colonel Dragutin Dimitrijević, Gyóni, like many other Austro-Hungarians, accepted the Imperial Government's allegations of, "a plot against us," and the necessity of fighting, "a defensive war." Some Hungarian intellectuals felt that World War I provided an excellent opportunity to pay back the House of Romanov for Tsar Nicholas I's pivotal role in the defeat of the Hungarian Revolution of 1848.

Gyóni re-enlisted and seemed initially to enjoy the soldier's life, regularly writing poetry that was sent back home from the front for publication.

According to Peter Sherwood, "Gyóni's first, still elated, poems from the Polish Front recall the 16th century Hungarian poet Bálint Balassi's soldiers' songs of the marches, written during the campaign against the Turks."

During the Siege of Przemyśl, Gyóni wrote poems to encourage the city's defenders and these verses were published there, under the title, Lengyel mezőkön, tábortúz melett (By Campfire on the Fields of Poland). A copy reached Budapest by aeroplane, which was an unusual feat in those days.

In Hungary, the politician Jenő Rákosi, used the popularity of Gyóni's collection to set up Gyóni as a brave soldier poet and as the paragon of the Hungarian poetic ideal, as opposed to Endre Ady, who was a pacifist. Meanwhile, Gyóni's poetry took an increasingly depressive turn.

According to Erika Papp Faber, "His leaning toward Socialism and his anti-militarist attitude were, for a brief time, suspended, as he was caught up in the general patriotic fervor at the outbreak of World War I. But once he experienced the horrors of war first hand, he soon lost his romantic notions, and returned to the more radical positions of his youth, as it evident in his further volumes."

One of his poems from this period, Csak egy éjszakára (For Just One Night), in which he calls for Hungary's war profiteers, industrialists, and armchair patriots to come and spend just one night in the trenches, became a prominent anti-war poem and its popularity has lasted well beyond the end of the First World War.

Gyóni was ultimately captured by the Imperial Russian Army after the surrender of Przemyśl in 1915. Gyóni wrote a poem in captivity which represented his attitude to life entitled Magyar bárd sorsa (A Hungarian bard's fate).

Nekem magyar bárd sorsát mérték:
Úgy hordom végig a világon
Véres keresztes magyarságom,
Mint zarándok a Krisztus képét.

A Hungarian bard's is my fate
To carry across the world
My bloodied, crusading Magyarhood
Like a pilgrim with a picture of Christ.

After being held for two years in atrocious conditions as a Prisoner of War, Gyóni died in a POW camp at Krasnoyarsk, in Siberia, on 25 June 1917. His last book of poems was published posthumously in 1919.

Géza Gyóni's anti-war poem Csak egy éjszakára ("For just one night"), remains very popular and is still taught in Hungarian schools. It has been translated into English by Canadian poet Watson Kirkconnell and by Hungarian American poet Erika Papp Faber.

Although Kirkconnell's translation renders Gyóni's poem into the same idiom as British war poets Siegfried Sassoon, Wilfred Owen, and Isaac Rosenberg, Erika Papp Faber's version is far more faithful to the original poem in Hungarian.

Georg Trakl, an Expressionist poet from Salzburg, enlisted in the Austro-Hungarian Army as a medical officer in 1914. He personally witnessed the Battle of Gródek, fought in the Kingdom of Galicia and Lodomeria, in which the Austro-Hungarian Army suffered a bloody defeat at the hands of the Imperial Russian Army. After the battle, Trakl was left in command of a field hospital filled with wounded soldiers and mentally collapsed from the ensuing strain.

One evening following the battle Trakl ran outside and attempted to shoot himself to escape from the screams of the wounded and the dying. He was prevented from doing so and was sent to a mental hospital. On the night of 3–4 November 1914, Georg Trakl died in a military hospital in Cracow from an overdose of cocaine. Trakl's batman, however, who was the last person to whom the poet spoke, believed that the overdose was an accident, rather than suicide. Georg Trakl is best known for the poem Grodek.

, a Jewish poet who wrote in German from Podiebrad an der Elbe in the Kingdom of Bohemia, had enlisted in the Austro-Hungarian Army as a one-year volunteer in 1913.

Upon the outbreak of war, Janowitz was stationed at Bozen in South Tirol and was immediately mobilized and sent to the Eastern Front. Following combat against the Imperial Russian Army in the Kingdom of Galicia and Lodomeria, Janowitz's Battalion was stationed behind the lines at Enns in Lower Austria, where most of his war poetry was written.

Janowitz was wounded in the chest by machine-gun fire from the Royal Italian Army during an assault on Monte Rombon, located near Bovec in the Julian Alps of modern Slovenia. The assault was part of the joint Austro-German counteroffensive known as the Battle of Caporetto.

On 4 November 1917, Janowitz died of his wounds at the nearby Field-Hospital #1301 at Mittel-Breth and was buried in the military cemetery at the same village. He has most likely been moved to the Austro-Hungarian military cemetery at Bovec in modern Slovenia.

Two years after his death, a volume of Janowitz's war poems, Aus der Erde und anderen Dichtungen ("Out of the Earth and Other Poems") was published in Munich. The first complete collection of his poems, however, came out only in 1992.

According to Jeremy Adler, "Franz Janowitz conflicts with the received idea of the best German war poets. Neither realistic, nor ironic, nor properly expressionistic, while he excoriated the battlefield that the whole world had become, he still preserved a Faith in nobility, innocence, and song. Forced into maturity by the war, his poetic voice never lost a certain childlike note – indeed, in some of his best poems, naivety and wisdom coexist to an almost paradoxical degree. Such poetry was fired by a vision of a transcendental realm that lay beyond conflict, but never sought to exclude death. His 25 years, the last four of which were spent in the Army, scarcely left him time to develop a wholly independent voice, but his work displays an increasing mastery of form and deepening of vision. His small oeuvre consists of Novellen, essays, aphorisms, and a handful of the best German poems connected with the Great War."

Germany

Despite the last-ditch efforts of Kaiser Wilhelm II and Tsar Nicholas II to avert the outbreak of the Great War through the Willy-Nicky Telegrams, the German people greeted the international crisis of August 1914 with patriotic euphoria. Hundreds of thousands of people filled the streets of Berlin, singing patriotic songs and loudly cheering the Austro-Hungarian Ambassador, the Kaiser, and their elected representatives. So great was the popular enthusiasm, that both the Kaiser and politicians from every political party concluded that if they did not go to war, they would never survive politically. A few anti-war rallies were organized by elements of the Social Democratic Party of Germany, but even that Party's far-left ultimately bowed to the popular will and agreed to support the war effort.

Even though historians of World War I poetry have traditional focused on English poets, there were also many talented German war poets, such as Rudolf G. Binding and Heinrich Mann.

August Stramm, who is considered the first of the expressionists, has been called by Jeremy Adler one of, "the most innovative poets of the First World War." Stramm, Adler writes, treated, "language like a physical material" and, "honed down syntax to its bare essentials." Citing Stramm's fondness for "fashioning new words out of old," Adler has also written that, "what James Joyce did on a grand scale for English, Stramm achieved more modestly for German."

Stramm's radically experimental verse and his major influence on all subsequent German poetry has also caused him to be compared to Ezra Pound, Guillaume Apollinaire, and T.S. Eliot.

A reserve officer in the Imperial German Army, Stramm was called up to active service immediately upon the outbreak of World War I.

Stramm's war poetry was first published by Herwarth Walden in the avant-garde literary journal Der Sturm and later appeared in the collection Tropfenblut ("Dripping Blood"), which was published in 1919.

According to Patrick Bridgwater, "While Stramm is known to have enjoyed his peacetime role of reserve officer, he was too sensitive to have any illusions about the war, which he hated (for all the unholy fascination it held for him). On 12 January 1915 he wrote to Walden from the Western Front, 'I stand like a cramp, unsteady, without a foundation, without a brace, anchored, and numb in the  grimace of my will and stubbornness,' and a few months later he wrote to his wife from Galicia that everything was so dreadful, so unspeakably dreadful. Thus while he was always absolutely sure where his duty lay, he did not write a single chauvinistic war poem even at the time when nearly everybody else in Germany - or so it seemed - was doing so. Nor did he write overtly anti-war poems, which his conscience would not have allowed him to do. In retrospect it seems extraordinary that the poem Feuertaufe ("Baptism by Fire") should have caused a scandal in the German press in 1915, for its only conceivable fault is its utter honesty, its attempt to convey the feeling of coming under enemy fire for the first time and its implicit refusal to pretend that the feeling in question was one of heroic excitement."

According to Jeremy Adler, "Although the letters testify to profound inner turmoil, Stramm was a popular officer and a brave soldier."

Serving as a company commander on both the Eastern and Western Fronts, Stramm repeatedly distinguished himself by acts of courage under enemy fire. Stramm's performance was particularly praised while he was serving under the command of General August von Mackensen during the Gorlice–Tarnów Offensive, which successfully drove the Imperial Russian Army out of Austrian Galicia and Congress Poland and into the Great Retreat of 1915. For his actions during the Offensive, Captain Stramm was highly decorated by both the Imperial German and Austro-Hungarian Armies.

At the beginning of August 1915, Stramm was sent home to Berlin on what would be his final furlough. His daughter Inge, who adored her father, later recalled how Stramm made her ten-year-old brother Helmuth promise, "never to let himself down," by being, "a Schweinhund before himself."

His family would later learn that throughout his furlough, Stramm had carried a letter in his pocket which he needed only to countersign to be released from all future military service at his publisher's request. By this time, Captain Stramm believed that his combat death was imminent. His mind was also filled with projects that he longed to write down. In the end, however, Stramm was, according to Patrick Bridgwater, "unable to accept the alibi of a higher duty to literature," and left the letter unsigned.

On 1 September 1915, mere weeks after returning to his unit, Captain August Stramm was shot in the head during brutal hand-to-hand combat against soldiers of the Imperial Russian Army who had retreated into the Rokitno Marshes.

According to Jeremy Adler, Stramm was about to be awarded the Iron Cross (First Class) at the time of his death.

A blood-stained copy of the 1904 German translation of the book "In Tune with the Infinite" (In Harmonie mit dem Unendlichen), by American New Thought philosopher Ralph Waldo Trine, was found in Stramm's pocket after his death. Stramm's enthusiasm for Trine is believed to have been a legacy of the time he had spent living in the United States.

According to Patrick Bridgwater, "What is quite extraordinary is that he appears to have found in the hell-on-earth of total warfare around Brest-Litovsk in 1915 the sense of harmony he had sought for so long."

A few weeks before his death, Stramm had written to Herwarth Walden, "Singularly, life and death are one... Both are one... Battle and the night and death and the nightingale are all one. One! And fighting and sleeping and dreaming and acting are all one! There is no separation! All goes together and swims and shimmers like sun and whirlpool. Only time goes forward, time this. So do fighting, hungering, singing, dying. All! Soldier and officer! Day and night! Sorrowing and bleeding! And a hand shines over me! I swim through everything. Am everything! I!".

On 2 September 1915, Captain August Stramm was buried with full military honors in the German military cemetery at Gorodec, in the Kobryn District of modern Belarus.

Captain Stramm and his son Helmuth both lie buried at the Südwestkirchhof Stahnsdorf, near the Berlin suburb of the same name.

When the war broke out in 1914, Gerrit Engelke, a working-class poet from Hanover, was in neutral Denmark. He at first hesitated to return, but was ultimately forced to do so by financial pressures. He served in combat for four years, experiencing the battles of Langemarck, St. Mihiel, the Somme, Dünaberg, and Verdun. In 1916, he was awarded the Iron Cross for swimming across the flooded Yser River. Engelke was wounded in 1917 and, during his recovery, he became engaged to a war widow, but was forced to return to combat in May 1918. His friends attempted to have him transferred away from the firing line, much to Engelke's outrage, as he felt a deep loyalty to his brothers in arms. He was fatally injured during a successful British assault on 11 October 1918, and died the following day at a British field hospital. He had previously written, "The greatest task which faces us after the war will be to forgive our enemy, who has, after all, been our neighbour on Earth since Creation."

Gerrit Engelke is best known for his anti-war poem An die Soldaten Des Grossen Krieges ("To the Soldiers of the Great War"), a poem in rhymed dactylic hexameter modeled after the Neo-Classical odes of Friedrich Hölderlin. In the ode, Engelke urges the soldiers of all the combatant nations to join hands together in universal brotherhood. An English translation exists by Patrick Bridgwater.

Walter Flex, who is best known as the author of the war poem Wildgänse rauschen durch die Nacht and the novella Der Wanderer zwischen Beiden Welten, was a native of Eisenach, in the Grand Duchy of Saxe-Weimar-Eisenach, and had attended the University of Erlangen. At the outbreak of the war, Flex was working as a private tutor to a family from the German nobility. Despite weak ligaments in his right hand, Flex immediately volunteered for the Imperial German Army.

According to Tim Cross, "His poetic outpourings on the war were prolific. Two collections, Sonne und Schild and Im Felde Zwischen Tag und Nacht were produced in the first months of the war. His body, soul, and literary talent were placed wholly at the disposal of the war-effort. The Christmas Fable for the 50th Regiment earned him the Order of the Red Eagle with Crown."

After service on both the Eastern and Western Fronts, Flex was fatally wounded in Estonia during Operation Albion. He died of his wounds at Oti Manor, on Saaremaa island on 16 October 1917.

Walter Flex was buried in the cemetery of Peude Church in the village of the same name.

Flex's epitaph was a quote from his 1915 war poem, Preußischer Fahneneid ("The Prussian Military Oath"):
"Wer je auf Preußens Fahne schwört, 
Hat nichts mehr, was ihm selbst gehört."

(Translation: 
"He whom on Prussia's banner swears 
Has nothing more his own to bear.")

In 1940, his body was moved to a new military cemetery in Königsberg, East Prussia. Walter Flex's grave, along with the rest the city, were completely destroyed during the three-month siege that preceded the city's surrender to the Soviet Army on 9 April 1945.

Owing to Flex's idealism about the Great War, the posthumous popularity of his writing, and the iconic status that was attached to his wartime death, he is now considered Germany's answer to Allied war poets Rupert Brooke and Alan Seeger.

Yvan Goll, a Jewish poet from Sankt Didel, in the disputed territory of Alsace-Lorraine, wrote bilingually in both German and French. At the outbreak of war in 1914, Goll fled to Zürich, in neutral Switzerland, to evade conscription into the Imperial German Army. While there, he wrote many anti-war poems, in which he sought to promote better understanding between Germany and France. His most famous war poem is Requiem. Für die Gefallenen von Europa (Requiem for the Dead of Europe).

Stefan George, a German poet who had done his literary apprenticeship with the French Symbolist poets in Paris, still had many friends in France and viewed the Great War as disastrous. In his 1916 anti-war poem Der Krieg ("The War"), George attacked the horrors that soldiers of all nations were facing in the trenches. In the poem, George famously declared, "The ancient god of battles is no more."

Reinhard Sorge, the Kleist Prize winning author of the Expressionist play Der Bettler, saw the coming of the war as an idealistic recent convert to the Roman Catholic Church. Sorge wrote many poems, many of which are in the experimental forms pioneered by August Stramm and Herwarth Walden, about both his Catholic Faith and what he was witnessing as a soldier with the Imperial German Army in France. Shortly before being mortally wounded by grenade fragments during the Battle of the Somme, Sorge wrote to his wife expressing a belief that what he called, "the Anglo-French Offensive" was going to succeed in overrunning German defenses. Sorge died in a field hospital at Ablaincourt on 20 July 1916. Sorge's wife only learned of his death when a letter, in which she informed her husband that he had gotten her pregnant during his last furlough, was returned to her as undeliverable.

In 1920, German poet Anton Schnack, whom Patrick Bridgwater has dubbed, "one of the two unambiguously great," German poets of World War I and, "the only German language poet whose work can be compared with that of Wilfred Owen," published the sonnet sequence, Tier rang gewaltig mit Tier ("Beast Strove Mightily with Beast").

Also according to Bridgwater, "The poems in Tier gewaltig mit Tier follow an apparently chronological course which suggests that Schnack served first in France and then in Italy. They trace the course of the war, as he experienced it, from departing for the front, through countless experiences to which few other German poets with the exception of Stramm have done justice in more than isolated poems, to retreat and the verge of defeat."

The 60 sonnets that comprise Tier rang gewaltig mit Tier, "are dominated by themes of night and death." Although his ABBACDDCEFGEFG rhyme scheme is typical of the sonnet form, Schnack also, "writes in the long line in free rhythms developed in Germany by Ernst Stadler," whom in turn had been inspired by the experimental free verse which had been introduced into American poetry by Walt Whitman.

Patrick Bridgwater, writing in 1985, called Tier rang gewaltig mit Tier, "without question the best single collection produced by a German war poet in 1914–18." Bridgwater adds, however, that Anton Schnack, "is to this day virtually unknown even in Germany."

France
Amongst French World War I poets are the following: Guillaume Apollinaire, Adrien Bertrand, Yvan Goll, and Charles Péguy.

Upon the outbreak of war in 1914, Blaise Cendrars, a Francophone Swiss poet of partially Scottish descent from La Chaux-de-Fonds, Canton of Neuchâtel, was living in Paris and playing a major role in modernist poetry. When it began, Cedrars and Italian writer Ricciotto Canudo appealed to other foreign artists, writers, and intellectuals to join the French Army. He joined the French Foreign Legion. He was sent to the front line in the Somme where from mid-December 1914 until February 1915, he was in the trenches at Frise (La Grenouillère and Bois de la Vache). During the Second Battle of Champagne in September 1915, Cendrars lost his right arm and was discharged from the French Army.

Cendrars later described his war experiences in the books La Main coupée ("The Severed Hand") and J'ai tué ("I Have Killed"), and it is the subject of his poem "Orion" in Travel Notes: 
"It is my star
It is in the shape of a hand
It is my hand gone up to the sky..."

The French Symbolist poet Louis Pergaud considered himself a Pacifist and, at the outbreak of war in 1914, he tried in vain to register as a conscientious objector. Instead, he was conscripted into the French Army and sent to the trenches of the Western Front.

On 7 April 1915, Pergaud's regiment attacked the Imperial German Army's trenches near Fresnes-en-Woëvre, during which he was wounded. Pergaud fell into barbed wire, where he became trapped. Several hours later, German soldiers rescued him and other wounded French soldiers and took them to a temporary field hospital behind German lines. On the morning of 8 April 1915, Pergaud and many other POWs were killed by friendly fire, when a French artillery barrage destroyed the hospital.

Jean de La Ville de Mirmont, a Huguenot poet from Bourdeaux, was overjoyed by the outbreak of the war.

According to Ian Higgins, "Although unfit for active service, Jean de La Ville de Mirmont volunteered immediately when the war broke out, but it was only after being repeatedly turned down that he finally managed to enlist."

In 1914, he was called to the front with the rank of sergeant of the 57th Infantry Regiment.

According to Ian Higgins, "It has been suggested that here at last was the great adventure he had been longing for. Certainly, the prelude to the war 'interested' him, and he was keen to witness and, if possible, take part in a war which was probably going to 'set the whole of Europe on fire.' His Lettres de guerre develop movingly from initial enthusiasm for the defense of Civilization and a conviction that the enemy was the entire German people, through a growing irritation with chauvinistic brainwashing and the flagrancy of what would now be called the 'disinformation' peddled through the French press (so much more heavily censored than the British, he said), to an eventual admiration, at the front, for the heroism and humanity often shown by the enemy."

La Ville de Mirmont was mentioned in French Army dispatches on 4 November 1914.

On 28 November, however, he was buried alive by a landmine explosion at Verneuil, near Chemin des Dames. Sergeant de La Ville de Mirmont was still alive when his comrades dug him out, but the explosion had broken his spinal column and he died soon afterwards. One account alleges that he died after saying, Maman. Other accounts, allege, however, that there were no last words.

The Breton poet and activist Yann-Ber Kalloc'h, a former Catholic seminarian from the island of Groix near Lorient, was best known by his Bardic name of Bleimor.

Even though he often used to say, "I am not in the least bit French", Kalloc'h enlisted in the French Army upon the outbreak of war in 1914.

According to Ian Higgins, "When the war came, [Kalloc'h], like so many others, saw it as a defense of civilization and Christianity, and immediately volunteered for the front. 'Only Ireland and Brittany', he writes in one poem, 'still help Christ carry the cross: in the fight to reinvigorate Christianity, the Celtic peoples are in the van'. In addition, now readily fighting for France, he saw the war as the great chance to affirm the national identity of Brittany and resurrect its language and culture."

Yann-Ber Kalloc'h, who wielded a sailor's axe formerly used in the French Navy for boarding enemy ships and was reportedly a terrible foe in hand-to-hand combat. His motto was "For God and Brittany". He was killed in action on 10 April 1917, when a German shell landed near his dugout near Urvillers/Cerizy (Aisne).

Kalloc'h's last work was the poetry collection, Ar en Deulin, which was published posthumously.

According to Jelle Krol, "It is not merely a collection of poems by a major Breton poet: it is a symbol of homage to Yann-Ber Kalloc'h and all those Bretons whose creative powers were cut short by their untimely deaths. Breton literature from the trenches is very rare. Only Yann-Ber Kalloc'h's poems, some war notes written by Auguste Bocher, the memoirs recounted by Ambroise Harel and Loeiz Herrieu's letters addressed to his wife survived the war."

Russia

Russia also produced a number of significant war poets including Alexander Blok, Ilya Ehrenburg (who published war poems in his book "On the Eve"), and Nikolay Semenovich Tikhonov (who published the book Orda (The Horde) in 1922).

The Acmeist poet Nikolay Gumilyov served in the Imperial Russian Army during World War I. He saw combat in East Prussia, the Macedonian front, and with the Russian Expeditionary Force in France. He was also decorated twice with the Cross of St. George. Gumilyov's war poems were assembled in the collection The Quiver (1916).

Gumilyov's wife, the poetess Anna Akhmatova, began writing poems during World War I that expressed the collective suffering of the Russian people as men were called up and the women in their lives bade them goodbye. For Akhmatova, writing such poems turned into her life's work and she continued writing similar poems about the suffering of the Russian people during the Bolshevik Revolution, the Russian Civil War, the Red Terror, and Joseph Stalin's Great Purge.

British Empire and Commonwealth

Australia

Leon Gellert, an Australian poet of Hungarian descent, was born in Walkerville, a suburb of Adelaide, South Australia. He enlisted in the First Australian Imperial Force's 10th Battalion within weeks of the outbreak of war and sailed for Cairo on 22 October 1914. He landed at ANZAC Cove, during the Gallipoli Campaign on 25 April 1915, was wounded and repatriated as medically unfit in June 1916. He attempted to re-enlist but was soon found out.

During periods of inactivity he had been indulging his appetite for writing poetry. Songs of a Campaign (1917) was his first published book of verse, and was favourably reviewed by The Bulletin. Angus & Robertson soon published a new edition, illustrated by Norman Lindsay. His second, The Isle of San (1919), also illustrated by Lindsay, was not so well received.

John O'Donnell was born in Tuam, County Galway, in 1890, and served in the Australian Imperial Force during World War I. He arrived at Gallipoli on 25 April 1915 and later fought at the Battle of the Somme. In 1918 he was invalided back to Australia, during which time he wrote the last six poems of his only poetry collection, dealing with the war from the perspective of an Australian poet.

Canada

John McCrae, a Scottish-Canadian poet and surgeon from Guelph, Ontario, had already served in the Canadian Light Artillery during the Second Anglo-Boer War. Upon the outbreak of World War I in 1914, McCrae joined the Canadian Expeditionary Force and was appointed as medical officer and major of the 1st Brigade CFA (Canadian Field Artillery). He treated the wounded during the Second Battle of Ypres in 1915, from a hastily dug,  bunker dug in the back of the dyke along the Yser Canal about 2 miles north of Ypres. McCrae's friend and former militia pal, Lt. Alexis Helmer, was killed in the battle, and his burial inspired the poem, In Flanders Fields, which was written on 3 May 1915, and first published in the magazine Punch.

From 1 June 1915, McCrae was ordered away from the artillery to set up No. 3 Canadian General Hospital at Dannes-Camiers near Boulogne-sur-Mer, northern France. C.L.C. Allinson reported that McCrae "most unmilitarily told [me] what he thought of being transferred to the medicals and being pulled away from his beloved guns. His last words to me were: 'Allinson, all the goddamn doctors in the world will not win this bloody war: what we need is more and more fighting men.'"

In Flanders Fields appeared anonymously in Punch on 8 December 1915, but in the index, to that year McCrae was named as the author. The verses swiftly became one of the most popular poems of the war, used in countless fund-raising campaigns and frequently translated (a Latin version begins In agro belgico...). "In Flanders Fields" was also extensively printed in the United States, whose government was contemplating joining the war, alongside a 'reply' by R. W. Lillard, ("...Fear not that you have died for naught, / The torch ye threw to us we caught...").

On 28 January 1918, while still commanding No. 3 Canadian General Hospital (McGill) at Boulogne, Lt.-Col. McCrae died of pneumonia with "extensive pneumococcus meningitis" at the British General Hospital in Wimereux, France. He was buried the following day in the Commonwealth War Graves Commission section of Wimereux Cemetery, just a couple of kilometres up the coast from Boulogne, with full military honours. His flag-draped coffin was borne on a gun carriage and the mourners – who included Sir Arthur Currie and many of McCrae's friends and staff – were preceded by McCrae's charger, "Bonfire", with McCrae's boots reversed in the stirrups. Bonfire was with McCrae from Valcartier, Quebec, until his death and was much loved. McCrae's gravestone is placed flat, as are all the others in the section, because of the unstable sandy soil.

Robert W. Service, an English-Canadian poet from Preston, Lancashire and who had already been dubbed, "The Canadian Kipling", was living in Paris when World War I broke out. He attempted to enlist, but was turned down for being overage at 41 and  "due to varicose veins." Service was a war correspondent for the Toronto Star (from 11 December 1915, through 29 January 1916), but "was arrested and nearly executed in an outbreak of spy hysteria in Dunkirk." He then "worked as a stretcher bearer and ambulance driver with the Ambulance Corps of the American Red Cross, until his health broke." Robert W. Service received three medals for his war service: 1914–15 Star, British War Medal and the Victory Medal.

While recuperating in Paris, Service wrote a volume of war poems, Rhymes of a Red-Cross Man, which was published in Toronto in 1916. The book was dedicated to the memory of Service's "brother, Lieutenant Albert Service, Canadian Infantry, Killed in Action, France, August 1916."

In 1926, Archibald MacMechan, professor of English at Dalhousie University in Halifax, Nova Scotia, published Headwaters of Canadian Literature, in which he sharply criticized the poetry about the Klondike Gold Rush upon which Service's reputation still rests. MacMechan, however, also praised Service's war poetry, writing, "his Rhymes of a Red Cross Man are an advance on his previous volumes. He has come into touch with the grimmest of realities; and while his radical faults have not been cured, his rude lines drive home the truth that he has seen."

In 1924, a poetic tribute to the Canadian Corps soldiers of the 85th Battalion (Nova Scotia Highlanders) was composed in Canadian Gaelic by Alasdair MacÌosaig  of St. Andrew's Channel, Cape Breton, Nova Scotia. The poem praised the courage of the Battalion's fallen Canadian Gaels and told them that they had fought better against the Imperial German Army than the English did, while also lamenting the absence of fallen soldiers from their families and villages. The poem ended by denouncing the invasion of Belgium and vowing, even though Kaiser Wilhelm II had managed to evade prosecution by being granted political asylum in the neutral Netherlands, that he would one day be tried and hanged. The poem was first published in the Antigonish-based newspaper The Casket on February 14, 1924.

England
The major novelist and poet Thomas Hardy (1840–1928) wrote a number of significant war poems that relate to the Napoleonic Wars, the Boer Wars and World War I, including "Drummer Hodge", "In Time of 'The Breaking of Nations'", "The Man He Killed" and ‘"And there was a great calm" (on the signing of the Armistice, Nov.11, 1918)’: his work had a profound influence on other war poets such as Rupert Brooke and Siegfried Sassoon". Hardy in these poems often used the viewpoint of ordinary soldiers and their colloquial speech. A theme in the Wessex Poems (1898) is the long shadow that the Napoleonic Wars cast over the 19th century, as seen, for example, in "The Sergeant's Song" and "Leipzig". The Napoleonic War is the subject of Hardy's drama in verse The Dynasts (1904–08).

At the beginning of World War I, like many other writers, Kipling wrote pamphlets and poems which enthusiastically supported the British war aims of restoring Belgium after that kingdom had been occupied by Germany together with more generalised statements that Britain was standing up for the cause of good.

For the first time, a substantial number of important British poets were soldiers, writing about their experiences of war. A number of them died on the battlefield, most famously Edward Thomas, Isaac Rosenberg, Wilfred Owen, and Charles Sorley. Others including Robert Graves, Ivor Gurney and Siegfried Sassoon survived but were scarred by their experiences, and this was reflected in their poetry. Robert H. Ross describes the British "war poets" as Georgian poets. Many poems by British war poets were published in newspapers and then collected in anthologies. Several of these early anthologies were published during the war and were very popular, though the tone of the poetry changed as the war progressed. One of the wartime anthologies, The Muse in Arms, was published in 1917, and several were published in the years following the war.

David Jones' epic poem of World War I In Parenthesis was first published in England in 1937, and is based on Jones's own experience as an infantryman in the War. In Parenthesis narrates the experiences of English Private John Ball in a mixed English-Welsh regiment starting with their leaving England and ending seven months later with the assault on Mametz Wood during the Battle of the Somme. The work employs a mixture of lyrical verse and prose, is highly allusive, and ranges in tone from formal to Cockney colloquial and military slang. The poem won the Hawthornden Prize and the admiration of writers such as W. B. Yeats and T. S. Eliot.

In November 1985, a slate memorial was unveiled in Poet's Corner commemorating 16 poets of the Great War: Richard Aldington, Laurence Binyon, Edmund Blunden, Rupert Brooke, Wilfrid Gibson, Robert Graves, Julian Grenfell, Ivor Gurney, David Jones, Robert Nichols, Wilfred Owen, Herbert Read, Isaac Rosenberg, Siegfried Sassoon, Charles Sorley and Edward Thomas.

For much of the Great War, G.K. Chesterton supported the British Empire's war effort against Imperial Germany. By the end of the war, however, Chesterton was singing the same tune as anti-war poets Siegfried Sassoon and Wilfred Owen.

In his 1922 poem Elegy in a Country Courtyard, Chesterton wrote:

The men that worked for England
They have their graves at home:
And birds and bees of England
About the cross can roam.
 
But they that fought for England,
Following a falling star,
Alas, alas for England
They have their graves afar.
 
And they that rule in England,
In stately conclave met,
Alas, alas for England,
They have no graves as yet.

Ireland

The fact that 49,400 Irish soldiers in the British Army gave their lives fighting in the Great War remains controversial in Ireland. This is because the Easter Rising of 1916 took place during the war and the Irish War of Independence began only a few months after the 11 November Armistice. For this reason, Irish republicanism has traditionally viewed Irishmen who serve in the British military as traitors. This view became even more prevalent after 1949, when Ireland voted to become a Republic and to leave the Commonwealth. For this reason, Ireland's war poets were long neglected.

One of them was Tom Kettle, a former member of the paramilitary Irish Volunteers and M.P. for the Irish Parliamentary Party. Despite his outrage over the Rape of Belgium, Kettle was very critical of the war at first. Comparing the Anglo-Irish landlord class to the aristocratic big estate owners who similarly dominated the Kingdom of Prussia, Kettle wrote, "England goes to fight for liberty in Europe and for Junkerdom in Ireland."

Later, when he was serving as a Lieutenant with the Royal Dublin Fusiliers on the Western Front, Kettle learned of the Easter Rising of 1916. After also learning of the executions of Roger Casement and sixteen of the Rising's other leaders, including every one of the signatories of the Proclamation of the Irish Republic, Kettle wrote, "These men will go down in history as heroes and martyrs and I will go down – if I go down at all – as a bloody British officer."

Mere months later, on 9 September 1916, Lieut. Kettle was shot in the chest during the Battle of Ginchy, in which the 16th (Irish) Division successfully captured and held the French village of the same name, which the Imperial German Army had been using as an artillery observation post during the Battle of the Somme. Lieut. Kettle's body was never found.

G. K. Chesterton later wrote, "Thomas Michael Kettle was perhaps the greatest example of that greatness of spirit which was so ill rewarded on both sides of the channel [...] He was a wit, a scholar, an orator, a man ambitious in all the arts of peace; and he fell fighting the barbarians because he was too good a European to use the barbarians against England, as England a hundred years before has used the barbarians against Ireland."

Lieut. Kettle's best-known poem is a sonnet, To My Daughter Betty, the Gift of God, which was written and mailed to his family just days before he was killed in action. It reads:

"In wiser days, my darling rosebud, blown
To beauty proud as was your mother's prime,
In that desired, delayed, incredible time,
You'll ask why I abandoned you, my own,
And the dear heart that was your baby throne,
To dice with death. And oh! they'll give you rhyme
And reason: some will call the thing sublime,
And some decry it in a knowing tone.
So here, while the mad guns curse overhead,
And tired men sigh with mud for couch and floor,
Know that we fools, now with the foolish dead,
Died not for flag, nor King, nor Emperor
But for a dream, born in a herdsman's shed
And for the secret Scripture of the poor."

When Francis Ledwidge, who was a member of the Irish Volunteers in Slane, County Meath, learned of the outbreak of the war, he decided against enlisting in the British Army. In response, the Unionist National Volunteers subjected Ledwidge to a show trial, during which they accused him of cowardice and of being pro-German. Soon after, Ledwidge enlisted in the Royal Inniskilling Fusiliers. Despite his twin beliefs in socialism and Irish republicanism, Ledwidge later wrote, "I joined the British Army because she stood between Ireland and an enemy common to our civilisation and I would not have her say that she defended us while we did nothing at home but pass resolutions."

Ledwidge published three volumes of poetry between 1916 and 1918, while he served at the Landing at Suvla Bay, on the Macedonian front and on the Western Front.

Like Kettle, Ledwidge was also deeply moved by the executions that followed the Easter Rising of 1916 and eulogized the 17 executed Republican leaders in his poems O’Connell Street, Lament for Thomas MacDonagh, Lament for the Poets of 1916, and in the Aisling poem The Dead Kings.

During a major rainstorm on the early morning of 31 July 1917, Ledwidge's battalion was laying beech-wood road planks in the boggy soil near the village of Boezinge, Belgium, in preparation for an imminent Allied offensive that would become known as the Battle of Passchendaele.

Shortly after the Fusiliers, who were soaked to the skin, were permitted a short break and issued hot tea, a German long-range artillery shell landed next to Ledwidge, who was killed instantly.

A Roman Catholic military chaplain, Father Devas, was the first on the scene. That night, Father Devas wrote in his diary, "Crowds at Holy Communion. Arranged for service but washed out by rain and fatigues. Walk in rain with dogs. Ledwidge killed, blown to bits; at Confession yesterday and Mass and Holy Communion this morning. R.I.P."

Francis Ledwidge was buried at Carrefour-de-Rose, and later re-interred in the nearby Artillery Wood Military Cemetery, near Boezinge, Belgium.

A monument to him, topped by the Irish tricolour, now stands on the site of his death. A stone tablet in honour of Francis Ledwidge also stands at the Island of Ireland Peace Park, near Messines, Belgium.

William Butler Yeats' first war poem was "On being asked for a War Poem"  written on 6 February 1915, in response to a request from Henry James for a political poem about World War I. Yeats changed the poem's title from "To a friend who has asked me to sign his manifesto to the neutral nations" to "A Reason for Keeping Silent" before sending it in a letter to James, which Yeats wrote at Coole Park on 20 August 1915. When it was later reprinted the title was changed to "On being asked for a War Poem".

Yeats' most famous war poem is An Irish Airman Foresees His Death, which is a soliloquy by Major Robert Gregory, an Irish nationalist flying ace who was also a friend of Yeats, and the son of Anglo-Irish landlord Sir William Henry Gregory and Yeats' patroness Lady Augusta Gregory.

Maj. Gregory, who had enlisted in the Connaught Rangers despite being overage and having three children, transferred to the Royal Flying Corps in 1916, where he was eventually credited with eight victories. Even though his fellow Irishmen Mick Mannock and George McElroy, with many more victories, have become much better known, Maj. Gregory was the first Irish pilot to achieve flying ace status in the RFC. The Third French Republic made him a Chevalier of the Legion d'Honneur in 1917, and he was awarded a Military Cross for "conspicuous gallantry and devotion to duty."

Maj. Robert Gregory was killed in action on 23 January 1918, when his Sopwith Camel crashed near Padua, Italy. Royal Flying Corps records in the British National Archives allege that Maj. Gregory was "shot down in error by an Italian pilot", a claim that has been repeated by both Yeats' and Lady Gregory's biographers. In 2017, Geoffrey O'Byrne White, the director of the Irish Aviation Authority, a distant cousin of Major Gregory, and a former pilot with the Irish Air Corps, said he believed his relative had become incapacitated at high altitude due to an inoculation that morning against influenza.

At the beginning of Yeats' poem, Maj. Gregory predicts his imminent death in an aerial dogfight. He declares that he does not hate the Germans he fights against or love the British whom he fights for. He comments that his countrymen are the poor Irish Catholic tenants of his mother's estate at Kiltartan, County Galway, that they will not mourn his death, and that his passing will have done nothing to improve their lives. He comments that he signed up to fight not for law, duty, the speeches of politicians, or the cheering crowds, but for, "a lonely impulse of delight."

Wishing to show restraint from publishing a political poem during the height of the Great War, Yeats withheld publication of An Irish Airman Foresees His Death until after the 1918 Armistice.

"The Second Coming" is a poem written by Irish poet W. B. Yeats in 1919, in the aftermath of the First World War and at the beginning of the Irish War of Independence, which followed the Easter Rising of 1916, but before David Lloyd George and Winston Churchill sent the Black and Tans to Ireland. The poem uses Christian imagery regarding the Apocalypse, the Antichrist, and the Second Coming to allegorise the state of Europe during the Interwar Period.

Scotland

Even though its author died in 1905, Ronald Black has written that Fr. Allan MacDonald's poem Ceum nam Mìltean ("The March of Thousands"), which describes a vision of legions of young men marching away to a conflict from whence they will not return, deserves to be, "first in any anthology of the poetry of the First World War", and, "would not have been in any way out of place, with regard to style or substance", in Sorley MacLean's groundbreaking 1943 volume Dàin do Eimhir.

Tragically, when the war began, Scotland was filled with patriotic euphoria and an enormous number of young men rushed up to enlist in the armed forces. During the First World War, kilt-wearing soldiers from the Scottish regiments were dubbed, "Die Damen aus der Hölle" ("The Ladies from Hell") by the soldiers of the Imperial German Army on the Western Front. In the 1996 memoir The Sea Hunters: True Adventures with Famous Shipwrecks, American author and explorer Clive Cussler revealed that his father, Eric Edward Cussler, served with the Imperial German Army on the Western Front during World War I. In later years, Eric Cussler used to tell his son that French Poilus were, "mediocre fighters", that British Tommies were, "tenacious bulldogs", and that American Doughboys, were, "real scrappers." Eric Cussler always added, however, "But my German comrades took anything they could all dish out. It was only when we heard the bagpipes from, 'The Ladies from Hell,' that we oozed cold sweat and knew a lot of us wouldn't be going home for Christmas."

Despite their effectiveness, however, the Scottish regiments suffered horrendous losses on the battlefield, which included many poets who wrote in English, Scots, and Scottish Gaelic.

In 1914, Scottish poet Charles Sorley, a native of Aberdeen, was living in Imperial Germany and attending the University of Jena. He later recalled that when the war began, his first feelings of patriotism were towards Germany. After being briefly interned as an enemy alien at Trier and ordered to leave the country, Sorley returned to Great Britain and enlisted in the Suffolk Regiment as a lieutenant. He was killed by a German sniper during the Battle of Loos in 1915 and his poems and letters were published posthumously.

Robert Graves described Charles Sorley in Goodbye to All That as "one of the three poets of importance killed during the war". (The other two being Isaac Rosenberg and Wilfred Owen.) Sorley believed that Germans and British were equally blind to each other's humanity and his anti-war poetry stands in direct contrast to the romantic idealism about the war that appears in the poems of Rupert Brooke, Walter Flex, and Alan Seeger.

The Scottish Gaelic poet John Munro, a native of Swordale on the Isle of Lewis, won the Military Cross while serving as a 2nd Lieutenant with the Seaforth Highlanders and was ultimately killed in action during the 1918 Spring Offensive. Lt. Munro, writing under the pseudonym Iain Rothach, came to be ranked by critics alongside the major war poets. Tragically, only three of his poems are known to survive. They are Ar Tir ("Our Land"), Ar Gaisgich a Thuit sna Blàir ("Our Heroes Who Fell in Battle"), and Air sgàth nan sonn ("For the Sake of the Warriors"). Derick Thomson – the venerable poet and Professor of Celtic Studies at Glasgow – hailed Munro as, "the first strong voice of the new Gaelic verse of the 20th century".

Ronald Black has written that Munro's three poems leave behind, "his thoughts on his fallen comrades in tortured free verse full of reminiscence-of-rhyme; forty more years were to pass before free verse became widespread in Gaelic."

Pàdraig Moireasdan, a Scottish Gaelic bard and seanchaidh from Grimsay, North Uist, served in the Lovat Scouts during World War I. He served in the Gallipoli Campaign, in the Macedonian front, and on the Western Front. In later years, Moireasdan, who ultimately reached the rank of corporal, loved to tell how he fed countless starving Allied soldiers in Thessalonica by making a quern. Corporal Moireasdan composed many poems and songs during the war, including Òran don Chogadh (A Song to the War"), which he composed while serving at Gallipoli.

In 1969, Gairm, a publishing house based in Glasgow and specializing in Scottish Gaelic literature, posthumously published the first book of collected poems by Dòmhnall Ruadh Chorùna. The poet, who had died two years previously in the hospital at Lochmaddy on the island of North Uist, was a combat veteran of the King's Own Cameron Highlanders during World War I and highly talented poet in Gaelic.

According to Ronald Black, "Dòmhnall Ruadh Chorùna is the outstanding Gaelic poet of the trenches. His best-known song An Eala Bhàn ("The White Swan") was produced there for home consumption, but in a remarkable series of ten other compositions he describes what it looked, felt, sounded and even smelt like to march up to the front, to lie awake on the eve of battle, to go over the top, to be gassed, to wear a mask, to be surrounded by the dead and dying remains of Gaelic-speaking comrades, and so on. Others of his compositions contain scenes of deer hunting, a symbolically traditional pursuit of which he happened to be passionately fond, and which he continued to practice all his life."

Unlike Charles Sorley, Wilfred Owen and Siegfried Sassoon, Dòmhnall Ruadh believed himself to be fighting a just war against a terrible enemy. The Bard's anger over the futility of the war only boiled over after the Armistice.

According to John A. Macpherson, "After the war, Dòmhnall Ruadh returned home to Corùna, but although he was thankful to be alive, he was, like most other returning soldiers, disillusioned. The land which they had been promised was as securely held by the landlords as it had ever been, and so were the hunting and fishing rights."

Many years later, Dòmhnall expressed his feelings about the years that followed the war in his poem, Caochladh Suigheachadh na Duthcha ("Changed Days"). He recalled the poverty of his youth and how he and his fellow Gaels went away to war and frustrated the Kaiser's war aims at a truly unspeakable cost in lives. Meanwhile, the Anglo-Scottish landlords of the Highlands and Islands stayed home and got richer. He recalled how after the war there was no work and how the Gaels emigrated from Scotland to all corners of the world. For those who stayed, there was no food except what was grown and ground by hand and supplemented by occasional discreet defiance of the landlords' bans on hunting and fishing.

Dòmhnall used to often say of those same years, "If it weren't for the gun and what I poached, it would have been dire poverty."

In his poem Dhan Gàidhlig ("For Gaelic"), Dòmhnall urged his fellow Gaels to "forget English", saying he had no use for it. He urged his listeners to remember their warrior ancestors from the Scottish clans, who never gave way in battle while there was still a head on their shoulders. Dòmhmnall compared Gaelic to a tree that had lost its branches and leaves. But he said that if people were to dig and weed around the base of its trunk, the tree would grow again and spread its leaves and branches. Dòmhnall expressed the hope that the descendants of the Gaels who were evicted during the Highland Clearances would return from around the world to hear from those who had stayed how heartlessly the landlords treated their ancestors. Dòmhnall also expressed a vision of the Scottish Gaeldom prosperous and teeming with children and how sheep, with which the landlords replaced those whom they evicted, would be replaced with Highland cattle. Dòmhnall concluded by predicting that the women in the milking fold will sing Gaelic songs and recite Gaelic poems as they work.

Dòmhnall Ruadh's poetry proved very popular and began being used to teach Gaelic in the schools of the Scottish Highlands and Islands. An expanded and bilingual edition was published by the Historical Society of North Uist in 1995. In 2016, Scottish Gaelic folk singer and North Uist native Julie Fowlis performed Dòmhnall Ruadh's wartime love song An Eala Bhàn ("The White Swan") at the Thiepval Memorial on the hundredth anniversary of the Battle of the Somme. Five senior members of the British Royal Family, Prince Charles, Camilla, Duchess of Cornwall, Prince William, Catherine, Duchess of Cambridge, and Prince Harry, Duke of Sussex, were in attendance.

Wales
At the outbreak of World War I, the vast majority of the Welsh populace were against being involved in the war. Throughout World War I, voluntary enlistment by Welshmen remained low and conscription was ultimately enacted in Wales to ensure a steady supply of new recruits into the armed forces. The war particularly left Welsh non-conformist chapels deeply divided. Traditionally, the Nonconformists had not been comfortable at all with the idea of warfare. The war saw a major clash within Welsh Nonconformism between those who backed military service and those who adopted Christian pacifism.

The most famous Welsh-language war poet remains Private Ellis Humphrey Evans of the Royal Welch Fusiliers, who is best known under his bardic name of Hedd Wyn.

Born in the village of Trawsfynydd, Wales, Evans wrote much of his poetry while working as a shepherd on his family's hill farm. His style, which was influenced by romantic poetry, was dominated by themes of nature and religion. He also wrote several war poems following the outbreak of war on the Western Front in 1914. Like many other Welsh nonconformists, Hedd Wyn was a Christian pacifist and refused to enlist in the armed forces, feeling that he could never kill anyone.

The war, however, inspired some of Hedd Wyn's most noted poems, including Plant Trawsfynydd ("Children of Trawsfynydd"), Y Blotyn Du ("The Black Dot"), and Nid â’n Ango ("[It] Will Not Be Forgotten"). His poem, Rhyfel ("War"), remains one of his most frequently quoted works.

Although farm work was classed as a reserved occupation, in 1916 the Evans family was ordered to send one of their sons to sign up for conscription. The 29-year-old Ellis enlisted rather than his younger brother Robert. In February 1917, he received his training at Litherland Camp, Liverpool.

In June 1917, Hedd Wyn joined the 15th Battalion Royal Welsh Fusiliers (part of the 38th (Welsh) Division) at Fléchin, France. His arrival depressed him, as exemplified in his quote, "Heavy weather, heavy soul, heavy heart. That is an uncomfortable trinity, isn't it?" Nevertheless, at Fléchin he finished his awdl Yr Arwr ("The Hero"), his submission to the National Eisteddfod of Wales, and signed it "Fleur de Lis". It is believed it was sent via the Royal Mail around the end of June.

The Battle of Passchendaele began at 3:50 a.m. on 31 July 1917, with heavy bombardment of German lines. However, the troops' advance was hampered by very effective German artillery and machine gun fire, and by heavy rain which turned the battlefield into a swamp.

Private Evans, as part of the 15th (Service) Battalion (1st London Welsh), was advancing towards an Imperial German Army strongpoint –created within the ruins of the Belgian hamlet of Hagebos ("Iron Cross")– when he was mortally wounded by shrapnel from a German nose cap shell.

Hedd Wyn was carried by stretcher bearers to a first-aid post. Still conscious, he asked the doctor, "Do you think I will live?" though it was clear that he had little chance of surviving; he died at about 11:00 a.m. on 31 July 1917.

Just a few weeks later, Hedd Wyn's awdl, Yr Arwr ("The Hero"), was posthumously awarded the Chair before a weeping audience at the National Eisteddfod of Wales. The Bardic Chair was delivered to the farmhouse of the Bard's parents draped in a black sheet. Ever since, the 1917 National Eisteddfod has been referred to as "Eisteddfod y Gadair Ddu" ("The Eisteddfod of the Black Chair").

Ellis H. Evans was buried at Artillery Wood Cemetery, near Boezinge, Belgium. After a petition was submitted to the Imperial War Graves Commission, his headstone was given the additional words Y Prifardd Hedd Wyn (English: "The Chief Bard, Hedd Wyn").

Albert Evans-Jones, a Welsh poet born in Pwllheli and who had graduated from the University College of North Wales at Bangor, served on the Salonica front and on the Western Front as a RAMC ambulance man and later as a military chaplain. After the war, he became a minister for the Presbyterian Church of Wales and wrote many poems that shocked the Welsh population with their graphic descriptions of the horrors of the trenches and their savage attacks on wartime ultra-nationalism. Also, in his work as Archdruid of the National Eisteddfod, Rev. Evans-Jones altered the traditional rituals, which were based in 18th century Celtic neopaganism, to better reflect the Christian beliefs of the Welsh people.

Rev. Evans-Jones, whom Alan Llwyd considers the greatest Welsh poet of the Great War, is best known under the bardic name of Cynan.

Welsh poet Alan Llwyd's English translations of many poems by both poets appear in the volume Out of the Fire of Hell; Welsh Experience of the Great War 1914–1918 in Prose and Verse. Among the most striking is the poem that follows:

Ballade by the War Memorial.
(A Speech that would not be heard on Armistice Day).
By Alfred Evans-Jones.
Translated by Alan Llwyd.

From ghostly realms I come, a shade,
On your dead sons' behalf, to see
What honour, praise, or accolade:
We would return to, not that we
Would wish for your false eulogy.
But what is this? – the old, old lie
On stones to shame our memory:
"For one's own land, it's sweet to die."

When the wild heart of youth was made
Tame by the clumsy artistry
Of some rough blacksmith's bayonet blade
Or the hot bullet's ecstasy,
Or when the shells whined endlessly,
And then became a colder cry,
Would you still sing so joyously:
"For one's own land, it's sweet to die?

But it is sweet to be dismayed
On seeing those whom we made free
Through war grown wealthy, while, betrayed,
My friends who fought for victory
Now starve: I'd break these stones to be
Bread for old comrades of days gone by
While you still sing with so much glee:
"For one's own land it's sweet to die."

L'Envoi.
Friend, in the colours of the O.T.C.,
One day you will remember why
I challenged such hypocrisy:
"For one's own land, it's sweet to die."

United States

The United States only entered the Great War in May 1917. By that time, the mass mechanized slaughter at the Somme, Verdun, and Passchendaele, which still haunt the other combatant nations, had already taken place.

By the time large numbers of soldiers from the American Expeditionary Forces (A.E.F.) arrived in France, they faced an Imperial German Army that was starving, exhausted, and which had already been bled white by three years of war. Furthermore, the German people were being systematically starved by a Royal Navy blockade and were increasingly on the brink of overthrowing the Monarchy. Although American Doughboys helped stem the 1918 Spring Offensive, captured Chipilly Ridge during the Battle of Amiens, won the Meuse-Argonne Campaign, and saved the Allies from having to contract a negotiated peace with the Central Powers, America's losses were far fewer than those of the other combatant nations, which lost an entire generation of young men. For this reason, World War I is a forgotten war in America today.

Although World War I in American literature is widely believed to begin and end with Ernest Hemingway's war novel A Farewell to Arms, there were also American war poets.

Alan Seeger, the uncle of songwriter Pete Seeger, enlisted in the French Foreign Legion while America was still neutral and became the first great American poet of the First World War. Seeger's poems, which passionately urged the American people to join the Allied cause, were widely publicized and remained popular.

In the end, Seeger was killed in action on 4 July 1916, during the French Army's attack against the trenches of the Imperial German Army at Belloy-en-Santerre, during the Battle of the Somme. His fellow French Foreign Legion soldier, Rif Baer, later described Seeger's last moments: "His tall silhouette stood out on the green of the cornfield. He was the tallest man in his section. His head erect, and pride in his eye, I saw him running forward, with bayonet fixed. Soon he disappeared and that was the last time I saw my friend." As he lay mortally wounded in no man's land, Seeger cheered on the passing soldiers of the legion until he died of his injuries.

In the United States, Alan Seeger's death was greeted with national mourning. Alan Seeger is sometimes called, "The American Rupert Brooke."

According to former First Lady Jacqueline Kennedy, decades after Alan Seeger's death, his poem I Have a Rendezvous with Death, was a great favorite of her husband, U.S. President John Fitzgerald Kennedy, who often asked her to read it aloud to him.

Joyce Kilmer, who was widely considered America's leading Roman Catholic poet and apologist and who was often compared to G.K. Chesterton and Hilaire Belloc, enlisted mere days after the United States entered World War I. In August 1917, Kilmer was transferred to the traditionally Irish-American regiment of the New York National Guard known as "The Fighting 69th", of the 42nd "Rainbow" Division. Kilmer quickly rose to the rank of sergeant. Though he was eligible for an officer's commission, Kilmer refused all offered promotions, saying that he would rather be a sergeant in the Fighting 69th than an officer in any other regiment.

Shortly before his deployment to Europe, Kilmer's daughter Rose died, and twelve days later, his son Christopher was born.  Before his departure, Kilmer had contracted with publishers to write a book about the war, deciding upon the title Here and There with the Fighting Sixty-Ninth. Kilmer never completed the book; however, toward the end of the year, he did find time to write prose sketches and war poetry.  The most famous of Kilmer's war poems is "Rouge Bouquet" (1918) which commemorates the victims of a German artillery barrage against American trenches in the Rouge Bouquet forest, near Baccarat, on the afternoon of 7 March 1918. 21 Doughboys from Kilmer's Regiment were buried alive by the barrage and 19 were killed (of whom 14 remain entombed).

On 30 July 1918, Sgt. Kilmer, whose coolness under enemy fire was legendary in the regiment, volunteered for a military intelligence mission led by Major William J. Donovan, the future head of the Office of Strategic Services, behind enemy lines during the Second Battle of the Marne. While leading a patrol that was attempting to locate a concealed German machine gun nest, Sgt. Kilmer was shot through the head by a German sniper at the Muercy Farm, beside the Ourcq River and near the village of Seringes-et-Nesles. Sgt. Joyce Kilmer was only 31-years old and was posthumously awarded the Croix de Guerre by the Government of the Third French Republic.

Sgt. Joyce Kilmer lies buried in the Oise-Aisne American Cemetery and Memorial, near Fere-en-Tardenois, Aisne, Picardy, which is located just across the road and stream from where he was killed. A Tridentine Requiem Mass was offered for the repose of his soul at St. Patrick's Cathedral in New York City on 14 October 1918.

According to Dana Gioia, however, "None of Kilmer's wartime verses are read today; his reputation survives on poems written before he enlisted."

In 1928, American poet and World War I veteran of the A.E.F. John Allan Wyeth published This Man's Army: A War in Fifty-Odd Sonnets.

B.J. Omanson recalls of his first encounter with the collection, "Wyeth's sequence... was over fifty sonnets long and, reading through just a few of them at random, indicated that not only were they highly skilled, but unusually innovative as well. What was most exciting was that they were written, not in an elevated, formal tone, but in a cool, concise, dispassionate voice, spiced with slangy soldiers' dialogue, French villagers' patois, and filled with as many small particulars of life as any of the finest soldier-diaries I had read."

The collection, which is written in an experimental form truly unique in the 800-year history of the sonnet, traces Wyeth's service as a 2nd Lieutenant and military intelligence officer assigned to the 33rd U.S. Infantry Division from receiving orders at Camp Upton to embark on a troop transport bound for France, during the ocean voyage, and through his journey into the firing line. At the time of his enlistment, Wyeth fluently spoke and read several languages and was a recent graduate of Princeton University, where his circle of friends had included Edmund Wilson and F. Scott Fitzgerald.

On 8 August 1918, the first day of the Battle of Amiens, was later described by General Erich Ludendorff as "Der Schwarzer Tag des deutschen Heeres" ("The blackest day of the German Army"). Enormous numbers of German enlisted men, whose will to continue fighting had been shattered, surrendered voluntarily or retreated en masse. German officers who tried to rally their men were showered with the kind of insults union members usually reserved for strikebreakers and were accused of trying to needlessly prolong the war. However, the otherwise rapid Allied advance ran into a very serious obstacle; "a bare seventy-five-foot-high ridge" in an oxbow bend of the Somme River near the village of Chipilly.

The German soldiers on Chipilly Ridge were able to command a wide field to the south of the Somme River and poured forth devastating machine gun and artillery fire that kept the Australian Corps pinned down at Le Hamel. The job of taking Chipilly Ridge was assigned to 3 Battalions of Doughboys from Wyeth's Division.

According to B.J. Omanson, "Their attack took place at 5:30 p.m.and, despite heavy machine gun and artillery fire pouring down on them from Chipilly Ridge, the Americans could not be driven back. They repeatedly pressed the assault until the northern half of the ridge and southern end of nearby Gressaire Wood were taken. Continuing the assault the following day, they took the rest of Gressaire Wood and by day's end were in possession of seven hundred German prisoners, thirty artillery pieces, one aircraft, and more than one hundred machine guns."

During the assault on Chipilly Ridge, Corporal Jake Allex, a Serbian immigrant from Kosovo, took command of his platoon after all the other officers had been killed. Corporal Allex led them in an attack against a German machine gun nest, during which he personally killed five enemy soldiers and took fifteen prisoners. For his actions during the assault on Chipilly Ridge, Corporal Allex became the second American soldier to be awarded the Congressional Medal of Honor during World War I.

On the night of 8–9 August 1918, as the assault on Chipilly Ridge was just beginning, Lieuts. Wyeth and Thomas J. Cochrane were assigned to deliver sealed orders from Division HQ at Molliens-au-Bois to the Field Headquarters of all three Battalions engaged in the attack. The precise location of each Battalion was unknown, but they were believed to be somewhere along the northern bank of the Somme River, near the village of Sailly-le-Sec. In his 1928 poetry collection, Wyeth described every phase of the mission in his six interlinked "Chipilly Ridge sonnets."

According to Bradley J. Omanson, "Lt. Wyeth, as it happened, was a cultured man, a recent Princeton graduate in languages and literature, and he rendered his experiences of that night into an accomplished, highly original cycle of six linked sonnets – part of a much longer cycle of over fifty sonnets which covered the entirety of his service in the war. But it is this self-contained six-sonnet sequence in particular – describing one soldier's stumblings through the metaphoric valley of death – which delves most memorably into the nature of war."

On the afternoon of 14 September 1918, while the men of the 33rd U.S. Division were stationed at Fromereville near Verdun, Wyeth was taking a shower with a group of bickering Doughboys when he heard the cry, "Air Raid!" Like every other bather, Wyeth ran, naked and covered with soap, into the village square. There, he watched as a Fokker D VII, flown by Unteroffizier Hans Heinrich Marwede from Jasta 67's aerodrome at Marville, attacked and set on fire three French observation balloons. Lieut. Wyeth later described Marwede's victory in his sonnet Fromereville: War in Heaven.

Although John Allan Wyeth's This Man's Army was highly praised by American literary critics, the 1929 Stock Market Crash soon followed its publication and, with the onset of the Great Depression, Wyeth's poetry was forgotten. When John Allan Wyeth died in Skillman, New Jersey, on 11 May 1981, his obituary made no mention of the fact that he had been a poet.

According to B.J. Omanson and Dana Gioia, who rescued Wyeth's poetry from oblivion during the early 21st century, Wyeth is the only American poet of the First World War who can withstand comparison with English war poets Siegfried Sassoon, Isaac Rosenberg, and Wilfred Owen. B.J. Omanson has also found that every event that Wyeth relates in his sonnets, down to the way he describes the weather, can be verified by other eyewitness accounts as completely accurate.

In response to the 2008 re-publication of The Man's Army, British literary critic Jon Stallworthy, the editor of The Oxford Book of War Poetry and the biographer of Wilfred Owen, wrote, "At long last, marking the ninetieth anniversary of the Armistice, an American poet takes his place in the front rank of the War Poet's parade."

Inspired by Canadian poet John McCrae's famous poem In Flanders Fields, American poet Moina Michael resolved at the war's conclusion in 1918 to wear a red poppy year-round to honour the millions of soldiers who had died in the Great War. She also wrote a poem in response called We Shall Keep the Faith. She distributed silk poppies to her peers and campaigned to have them adopted by the American Legion as an official symbol of remembrance. At the 1920 convention, the American Legion formally adopted Michael's proposal of adopting Remembrance poppies as a national symbol.

The Russian Civil War
During the Russian Civil War, the Russian Symbolist poet Vyacheslav Ivanov wrote the sonnet sequence "Poems for a Time of Troubles."

Between 1917 and 1922, Russian poet Marina Tsvetaeva, whose husband Sergei Efron was serving as an officer in the anti-communist Volunteer Army, wrote the epic verse cycle Lebedinyi stan (The Encampment of the Swans) about the civil war, glorifying the anti-communist soldiers of the White Movement. The cycle of poems is in the style of a diary or journal and begins on the day of Tsar Nicholas II's abdication in March 1917, and ends late in 1920, when the Whites had been completely defeated. The 'swans' of the title refers to the volunteer soldiers of the White Army. In 1922, Tsvetaeva also published a lengthy monarchist fairy tale in verse, Tsar-devitsa ("Tsar-Maiden").

On the other side, Osip Mandelstam wrote many poems praising the Red Army and rebuking the Whites, whom he referred to in one poem as, "October's withered leaves." In the end, however, Mandelstam, who believed deeply in the tradition that poets are the conscience of the Russian people, died in the Gulag in 1938, after being arrested for composing an epigram that both attacked and mocked Stalin.

The Spanish Civil War

The Spanish Civil War produced a substantial volume of poetry in English (as well as in Spanish). There were English-speaking poets serving in the Spanish Civil War on both sides. Among those fighting with the Republicans as volunteers in the International Brigades were Clive Branson, John Cornford, Charles Donnelly, Alex McDade and Tom Wintringham.

On the Nationalist side, the most famous English-language poet of the Spanish Civil War remains South African poet Roy Campbell. Campbell was living in Toledo with his family when hostilities started. As a recent convert to the Roman Catholic Church, Campbell was horrified to witness the violent religious persecution of Catholics as part of the wider Red Terror ordered by the Pro-Soviet leadership of Republican forces. A particularly chilling moment for Campbell was when he came across the bodies of Toledo's Carmelite monks, whom he had befriended, after Republican forces had subjected them to execution without trial. The monks' executioner's had then written in blood above their bodies, "Thus strikes the CHEKA." Campbell later retold the execution in his poem The Carmelites of Toledo and finished the same poem by pointing out the role that local massacres of Roman Catholic priests, laity, and religious orders played in causing the city's Spanish Army garrison to join Francisco Franco's mutiny against the Second Spanish Republic and to repeatedly refuse to surrender during the Siege of the Alcázar. Of Campbell's other poems about the War, the best are the sonnets Hot Rifles, Christ in Uniform, The Alcazar Mined, and Toledo 1936.

According to Campbell's biographer, Joseph Pearce, and his daughters Anna and Tess, Campbell's pro-Nationalist stance has caused him, in an early version of cancel culture, to be inaccurately labeled as a Fascist and left out of poetry anthologies and college courses.

In Afrikaans literature, the best poet of the Spanish Civil War is Campbell's close friend Uys Krige, who was born at Bontebokskloof near Swellendam in Cape Province and who campaigned just as passionately for the Republican faction. In Roy Campbell's 1952 memoir, Light on a Dark Horse, he explains Uys Krige's Republican sympathies by the latter being, "an incurable Calvinist."

In 1937, Krige wrote the Afrikaans poem, Lied van die fascistiese bomwerpers ("Hymn of the Fascist Bombers").

Krige later recalled, "I needed only a line or two, then the poem wrote itself. My hand could hardly keep pace. I did not have to correct anything. Well... that seldom happens to you." The poem condemned the bombing raids by pro-Nationalist Luftwaffe pilots of the Condor Legion. Inspired, according Jack Cope, by Krige's upbringing within Afrikaner Calvinism and its traditional hostility to an allegedly corrupt Pre-Reformation Church, Lied van die fascistiese bomwerpers also leveled savage attacks against Roman Catholicism.

According to Jack Cope, "The poem starts on a note of military pride - the eyes of the Fascist pilots fixed on themselves in their joyful and triumphant, their holy task. The tone of bitter irony rises as the pace becomes faster, climbing to height after height of savagery and contempt. The lines of the Latin liturgy become mixed with the brutal exultation of the mercenaries raining down death from their safe altitude. The Bible itself is rolled in the blood. The lovely place-names of Spain rise in gleams above the dust and smoke. In the end the hymn becomes an insane scream of violence and bloody destruction mocking even the Crucifixion."

As no Afrikaans journal dared to publish it, Uys Krige's Lied van die fascistiese bomwerpers appeared in the Forum, a Left-leaning literary journal published in English. Krige's poem elicited vehement condemnations from both extreme Afrikaner nationalists and from the Catholic Church in South Africa, which "protested vehemently" called Krige's poem sacrilegious. Krige responded by asking whether South African Catholics approved of the Nationalist faction's dismantling of what he considered the lawful Spanish Government or in the ongoing White Terror.

Despite their disagreement over the war in Spain, however, Campbell and Krige remained close friends and, in later years, worked together as activists against the rule of the White Supremacist National Party in South Africa under apartheid.

The best Spanish-language poets of the Civil War are Republican poet Federico García Lorca, Carlist poet José María Hinojosa Lasarte, and the Machado brothers. Antonio Machado wrote a poem to honor the Communist General Enrique Líster, and died a refugee in France after the defeat of the Republic. Meanwhile, his brother, Manuel Machado, dedicated a poem to the saber of the Nationalist Generalissimo Francisco Franco.

Ultimately, Federico Garcia Lorca lost his life after being abducted by Nationalist soldiers and executed without trial as part of the ongoing White Terror.

Ironically, Surealist poet José María Hinojosa Lasarte, a former Communist turned enthusiastic monarchist and Carlist, was arrested and murdered by the Republican side under very similar circumstances during the Red Terror.

Chilean poet Pablo Neruda became intensely politicised for the first time during the Spanish Civil War. As a result of his experiences in Spain, Neruda became an ardent Communist and remained one for the rest of his life. The radical leftist politics of his literary friends were contributing factors, but the most important catalyst was the abduction and execution without trial of the Republican poet Federico García Lorca by Nationalist soldiers. By means of his speeches and writings, Neruda threw his support behind the Second Spanish Republic, publishing the collection España en el corazón (Spain in Our Hearts) in 1938. He lost his post as Chilean consul due to his refusal to remain politically neutral.

World War II

Poland
The Second Polish Republic is sometimes referred to as the country that lost the Second World War twice: first to Adolf Hitler and then to Joseph Stalin. Not surprisingly, Poland's war, both in conventionial and guerrilla warfare, continued to inspire poetry long after all fighting had ceased.

Czesław Miłosz has since written, "Before World War II, Polish poets did not differ much in their interests and problems from their colleagues in France and Holland. The specific features of Polish literature notwithstanding, Poland belonged to the same cultural circuit as other European countries. Thus one can say that what occurred in Poland was the encounter of a European poet with the hell of the twentieth century, not hell's first circle, but a much deeper one. This situation is something of a laboratory, in other words: it allows us to examine what happens to modern poetry in certain historical conditions."

After SS General Jürgen Stroop suppressed the Warsaw Ghetto uprising in 1943, anti-Nazi Polish poet Czesław Miłosz wrote the poem Campo dei Fiore. In the poem, Miłosz compared the burning of the Ghetto and its 60,0000 inhabitants to the burning at the stake of Giordano Bruno by the Roman Inquisition in 1600. Miłosz criticized the Polish people for just going on with their daily routines while the Ghetto was burning. He ended by urging his listeners and readers to feel outraged over the Holocaust in Poland and to join the Polish Resistance in their fight against the Nazi Occupiers.

Also in response to the Warsaw Ghetto uprising, poet Hirsh Glick, who was imprisoned in the Vilna Ghetto, wrote the Yiddish poem Zog Nit Keynmol, in which he urged his fellow Jews to take up arms against Nazi Germany, instead of dying peacefully like six-million lambs. Despite Glick's own murder by the SS in 1944, Zog Nit Keynmol was set to music and widely adopted by Jewish partisans as an anthem of resistance against the Holocaust. For this reason Zog Nit Keynmol is still sung at memorial services around the world on Yom HaShoah.

In 1974, Anna Świrszczyńska published the poetry collection Budowałam barykadę ("Building the Barricade"), about her experiences as both a combatant and battlefield nurse during the 1944 Warsaw uprising, in which the Armia Krajowa, acting under orders from the Polish Government in Exile in London, tried as part of Operation Tempest to liberate Poland's pre-war capital city from the occupying Germans before Joseph Stalin's Red Army could do so. Instead, Soviet soldiers waited across the Vistula River for more than two months and calmly watched as the Polish combatants were slaughtered en masse by the combined forces of the Wehrmacht, the Luftwaffe, and the Waffen SS. Then, by order of Adolf Hitler, the entire city of Warsaw was burned to the ground.

Czesław Miłosz later wrote about Świrszczyńska, "In August and September of 1944, she took part in the Warsaw Uprising. For sixty-three days she witnessed and participated in a battle waged by a city of one million people against tanks, planes, and heavy artillery. The city was destroyed gradually, street by street, and those who survived were deported. Many years later, Świrszczyńska tried to reconstruct that tragedy in her poems: the building of barricades, the basement hospitals, the bombed houses caving in burying the people in shelters, the lack of ammunition, food, and bandages, and her own adventures as a military nurse. Yet these attempts of hers did not succeed: they were too wordy, too pathetic, and she destroyed her manuscripts. (Also, for a long time the Uprising was a forbidden topic, in view of Russia's role in crushing it). No less than thirty years after the event did she hit upon a style that satisfied her. Curiously enough, that was the style of miniature, which she had discovered in her youth, but this time not applied to paintings. Her book Building the Barricades consists of very short poems, without meter or rhyme, each one a microreport on a single incident or situation."

About one Świrszczyńska poem set during the Uprising, Miłosz writes, "The small poem, A Woman Said to her Neighbor, contains a whole way of life, the life in the basements of the incessantly bombed and shelled city. Those basements were connected by passages bored through the walls to form an underground city of catacombs. The motions and habits accepted in normal conditions were reevaluated there. Money meant less than food, which was usually obtained by expeditions to the firing line; considerable value was attached to cigarettes, used as a medium of exchange; human relations also departed from what we are used to considering the norm and were stripped of all appearances, reduced to their basest shape. It is possible that in this poem we are moved by the analogy with peacetime conditions, for men and women are often drawn together not from mutual affection but from their fear of loneliness:

"A woman said to her neighbor:
'Since my husband was killed I can't sleep,
I tremble all night long under the blanket.
I'll go crazy if I have to be alone today,
I have some cigarettes my husband left, please,
Do drop in tonight.'"

Hungary

Hungarian Jewish poet and Roman Catholic convert Miklós Radnóti was a vocal critic of the Pro-German Governments of Admiral Miklós Horthy and of the Arrow Cross Party.

According to Radnóti's English translator Frederick Turner, "One day, one of Radnóti's friends saw him on the streets of Budapest, and the poet was mumbling something like, 'Du-duh-du-duh-du-duh,' and his friend said, 'Don't you understand?! Hitler is invading Poland!' And Radnóti supposedly answered, 'Yes, but this is the only thing I have to fight with.' As his poetry makes clear, Radnóti believed that Fascism was the destruction of order. It both destroyed and vulgarized civil society. It was as if you wanted to create an ideal cat, so you took your cat, killed it, removed its flesh, put it into some kind of mold, and then pressed it into the shape of a cat. That's what Fascism does, and that's what Communism does. They both destroy an intricate social order to set up a criminally simple-minded order."

Like many other Hungarians of Jewish descent or "unreliable" political views, Radnóti was drafted into a forced labor battalion by the Royal Hungarian Army during World War II. During this experience of slave labor in the copper mines of Occupied Yugoslavia, Radnóti continued to compose new poems, which he wrote down in a small notebook that he had purchased. In the last days of the Second World War, Radnóti fell ill during a forced march from Bor towards Nazi Austria.

In early November 1944, along with 21 other sick and emaciated prisoners, Radnóti was separated from the march near the Hungarian city of Győr. They were taken in a cart by three NCOs of the Royal Hungarian Army first to a village hospital, and then to a school that housed refugees. Both the hospital and the school, however, insisted that they had no room for Jews.

Between 6 and 10 November 1944, the three NCOs took the 22 Jewish prisoners to the dam near Abda, where they were forced to dig their own mass grave. Each prisoner was then shot in the base of the neck and buried. After the end of the war, the mass grave was re-exhumed and Radnóti's last five poems were found in the dirty, bloodstained notebook in his pocket. Miklós Radnóti was reburied in Kerepesi Cemetery in Budapest. After the death of his wife in 2013, she was buried next to him.

Since his murder, Radnóti has become widely recognized as one of the greatest Hungarian-language poets of the 20th century. His English translator Zsuzsanna Ozsváth, who carried a volume of Radnóti's poems with her when she fled across the Austrian border after the defeat of the Hungarian Revolution of 1956, has written that Radnóti's verses have been translated into Hebrew, English, and many other European and Asian languages. His importance to 20th-century poetry, to Hungarian literature, and to the literature of the Holocaust in Hungary resulted in Oszsváth and Turner's own collaboration, which was assisted by the poet's widow, and which resulted in the 1992 collection Foamy Sky: The Major Poems of Miklós Radnóti.

Italy
The 2005 poem Cephalonia, by Italian poet Luigi Ballerini, is about the 1943 Massacre of the Acqui Division, in which more than 5,000 officers and enlisted men of the Royal Italian Army were shot without trial on the island of Cephalonia in Occupied Greece by German and Austrian soldiers of the Wehrmacht. After learning of King Victor Emmanuel III's successful coup d'etat against dictator Benito Mussolini and the Italian Armistice with the Allies, the Acqui Division had chosen to fight against their former allies under orders from the new Italian Government. In modern Greece, the Italian victims of the massacre, one of countless other un-prosecuted War crimes of the Wehrmacht, are referred to as, "The Martyrs of Cephalonia."

The poet's father, Raffaele Costantino Edoardo Ballerini, known as Ettore, was a soldier in the Acqui Division who was killed in action fighting against the Wehrmacht in the battle that preceded the massacre.

Soviet Union
During World War II, Anna Akhmatova witnessed the 900-day Siege of Leningrad and read her poems over the radio to encourage the city's defenders. In 1940, Akhmatova started her Poem without a Hero, finishing a first draft in Tashkent, but working on  "The Poem" for twenty years and considering it to be the major work of her life, dedicating it to "the memory of its first audience – my friends and fellow citizens who perished in Leningrad during the siege".

After the war, Soviet Premier Joseph Stalin was stunned to see Akhmatova given a standing ovation by Russians who remembered her wartime broadcasts. Stalin gave orders to find out who organized the standing ovation and launched a campaign of blacklisting and defamation against the poetess, in which she was called, "Half harlot, half nun."

In the 1974 poem Prussian Nights, Soviet dissident Alexander Solzhenitsyn, a former captain in the Red Army during World War II, graphically describes Soviet war crimes in East Prussia. The narrator, a Red Army officer, approves of his troops' looting and rapes against German civilians as revenge for German war crimes in the Soviet Union and he hopes to take part in the atrocities himself. The poem describes the gang-rape of a Polish woman whom the Red Army soldiers had mistaken for a German. According to a review for The New York Times, Solzhenitsyn wrote the poem in trochaic tetrameter, "in imitation of, and argument with the most famous Russian war poem, Aleksandr Tvardovsky's Vasili Tyorkin."

Serbia
Amongst Serbian poets during World War II, the most notable is Desanka Maksimović. She is well known for "Krvava bajka" or "A Bloody Fairy Tale". The poem is about a group of schoolchildren in Occupied Yugoslavia who fall victim to the 1941 Wehrmacht war crime known as the Kragujevac massacre.

Finland
Yrjö Jylhä published a poetry collection in 1951 about the Winter War, in which Finland fought against Joseph Stalin and the invading Red Army. The name of the collection was Kiirastuli (Purgatory).

British Empire and Commonwealth

Canada

One of the most famous World War II poets in both Canadian and American poetry is John Gillespie Magee Jr., an American fighter pilot who had volunteered to fly for the Royal Canadian Air Force before America entered the Second World War. Gillespie wrote the iconic and oft-quoted sonnet High Flight, a few months before his death in an accidental collision over Ruskington, Lincolnshire, on December 11, 1941. Originally published in the Pittsburgh Post-Gazette, High Flight was widely distributed after Pilot Officer Magee became one of the first post-Pearl Harbor American citizens to die in the Second World War. Since 1941, Pilot Officer Maher's sonnet has been featured prominently in aviation memorials across the world, including that for the 1986 Space Shuttle Challenger disaster.

England
By World War II the role of "war poet" was so well-established in the public mind, and it was anticipated that the outbreak of war in 1939 would produce a literary response equal to that of the First World War. The Times Literary Supplement went so far as to pose the question in 1940: "Where are the war-poets?" Alun Lewis and Keith Douglas are the standard critical choices amongst British war poets of this time. In 1942, Henry Reed published a collection of three poems about British infantry training entitled Lessons of the War; three more were added after the war. Sidney Keyes was another important and prolific Second World War poet.

Ireland
Despite nominally still being a Commonwealth country, Ireland's Taoiseach Éamon de Valera and the ruling Fianna Fail party chose to remain neutral during the Second World War. Although this decision has been called Ireland's second declaration of independence, it outraged Winston Churchill, who saw Ireland's neutrality as not only immoral but illegal. Although De Valera discreetly bent Irish neutrality in favour of the Western Allies, the British Foreign Office and the U.S. State Department secretly engaged in multiple unsuccessful intrigues aimed at weakening De Valera's popularity and bringing Ireland into the war.

Despite Ireland's neutrality, the events and atrocities of that war did inspire Irish poetry as well.

In his 1964 poetry collection Lux aeterna, Eoghan Ó Tuairisc, an Irish-language poet from Ballinasloe, County Galway, included a long poem inspired by the Atomic bombings of Hiroshima and Nagasaki, entitled Aifreann na marbh ("Mass for the Dead"). The poem is an imitation of the Roman Catholic Requiem Mass, "with the significant omission of 'Credo' and 'Gloria.'"

According to Louis De Paor, "In the course of the poem, the glories of Irish and European civilisation, of art, literature, science, commerce, philosophy, language, and religion are interrogated and found incapable of providing a meaningful response to the apparently unlimited human capacity for destruction. In the month of Lúnasa, the Pagan Celtic God of light, on the Christian feast day of the Transfiguration, Dé Luain (Monday) becomes Lá an Luain (Doomsday), as the destructive light of atomic annihilation replaces the natural light of the sun. The poem also draws on early Irish literature to articulate Ó Tuairisc's idea that the poet has a responsibility to intercede in the eternal struggle between love and violence through the unifying, healing, power of creative imagination. While everyone is culpable in the annihilation of Hiroshima, the poet, the word-priest, bears a particular burden of responsibility."

New Zealand
New Zealand's war poets include H. W. Gretton, whose poem Koru and Acanthus is a notable work in the genre. His war diary, made whilst serving with the 2NZEF in Italy, is also an important social-historical document.

Scotland
Hamish Henderson a Scottish poet from Blairgowrie, Perthshire, served as an officer in the British Army Intelligence Corps during the North African Campaign. During his service, Henderson collected the lyrics to  "D-Day Dodgers," a satirical song to the tune of "Lili Marlene", attributed to Lance-Sergeant Harry Pynn, who had served in Italy. Henderson also wrote the lyrics to The 51st (Highland) Division's Farewell to Sicily, set to a pipe tune called "Farewell to the Creeks". The book in which these were collected, Ballads of World War II, was published "privately" to evade censorship, but still earned Henderson a ten-year ban from BBC radio. Henderson's 1948 poetry book about his experiences in the war, Elegies for the Dead in Cyrenaica, received the Somerset Maugham Award.

Scottish Gaelic poet Duncan Livingstone, a native of the Isle of Mull who had lived in Pretoria, South Africa, since 1903, published several poems in Gaelic about the war. They included an account of the Battle of the River Plate and also an imitation of Sìleas na Ceapaich's early 18th century lament, Alasdair a Gleanna Garadh, in honor of Livingstone's nephew, Pilot Officer Alasdair Ferguson Bruce of the Royal Air Force, who was shot down and killed during a mission over Nazi Germany in 1941.

Scottish Gaelic poet Sorley MacLean was raised in the Free Presbyterian Church of Scotland, which he later described as "the strictest of Calvinist fundamentalism" on the Isle of Raasay. He had become, by the outbreak of World War II, a Communist-sympathiser. MacLean was also a soldier poet who wrote about his combat experiences with the Royal Corps of Signals during the Western Desert campaign. MacLean's time in the firing line ended after he was severely wounded at the Second Battle of El Alamein in 1941.

MacLean's most famous Gaelic war poem is Glac a' Bhàis ("The Valley of Death"), which relates his thoughts on seeing a dead German soldier in North Africa. In the poem, MacLean ponders what role the dead man may have played in Nazi atrocities against both German Jews and members of the Communist Party of Germany. MacLean concludes, however, by saying that whatever the German soldier may or may not have done, he showed no pleasure in his death upon Ruweisat Ridge.

Following the war, MacLean would go on to become a major figure in world literature. He was described by the Scottish Poetry Library as "one of the major Scottish poets of the modern era" because of his "mastery of his chosen medium and his engagement with the European poetic tradition and European politics". Northern Irish poet and winner of the Nobel Prize for Literature Seamus Heaney has credited MacLean with saving Scottish Gaelic poetry.

Upon the outbreak of the Second World War in September 1939, North Uist war poet Dòmhnall Ruadh Chorùna composed the poem Òran dhan Dara Chogaidh ("A Song for World War II"). In the poem, Dòmhnall urged the young Scottish Gaels who were going off to fight to not be afraid and that victory over Adolf Hitler and Nazi Germany would come by October 1939.

On 16 November 1939, the British merchant ship S.S. Arlington Court was torpedoed and sunk in the Atlantic Ocean by the German submarine U-43. In his poem Calum Moireasdan an Arlington Court ("Calum Morrison of the Arlington Court"), Dòmhnall paid tribute to the courage shown by one of the survivors, a seventeen year old Gaelic-speaking merchant seaman from Calbost on the Isle of Lewis. Morrison had been the only survivor in his lifeboat who had known how to sail and had managed to pilot their lifeboat eastwards for five days, until he and his fellow survivors were rescued at the mouth of the English Channel.

Also during the Second World War, Dòmhnall served in the Home Guard, about which he composed the song Òran a' Home Guard ("The Song of the Home Guard"), which pokes fun at an exercise in which a platoon from North Uist was ordered to simulate taking the airfield at Benbecula from the invading Wehrmacht.

At the same time, Dòmhnall's son Calum MacDonald served in the Merchant navy, and regularly sailed within sight of North Uist on his travels between the port of Glasgow and the United States. With this in mind, the Bard composed the poem Am Fianais Uibhist ("In Sight of Uist").

Aonghas Caimbeul (1903–1982), a Scottish Gaelic poet from Swainbost on the Isle of Lewis, had served during the Interwar Period with the Seaforth Highlanders in British India. While there, Caimbeul had heard Mahatma Gandhi speak and had also seen the aviator Amy Johnson. Therefore, upon the outbreak of World War II in September 1939, Caimbeul rejoined his old regiment and saw combat against the invading Wehrmacht during the Fall of France. After the 51st (Highland) Division surrendered to Major-General Erwin Rommel at Saint-Valery-en-Caux on 12 June 1940, Caimbeul spent the rest of the war in POW camps in Occupied Poland, where he mostly did unpaid agricultural labor.

In his award-winning memoir Suathadh ri Iomadh Rubha, Caimbeul recalled the origins of his poem, Deargadan Phòland ("The Fleas of Poland"), "We called them the Freiceadan Dubh ('Black Watch'), and any man they didn't reduce to cursing and swearing deserved a place in the courts of the saints. I made a satirical poem about them at the time, but that didn't take the strength out of their frames or the sharpness out of their sting."

Caimbeul composed other poems during his captivity, including Smuaintean am Braighdeanas am Pòland, 1944 ("Thoughts on Bondage in Poland, 1944").

After a three-month-long forced march from Thorn to Magdeburg which he graphically describes in his memoirs, Caimbeul was liberated from captivity on 11 April 1945. He returned to his native Swainbost and spent his life there as a shopkeeper until he died at Stornoway on 28 January 1982.

Aonghas Caimbeul's collected poems, Moll is Cruithneachd, were published at Glasgow in 1972 and were favorably reviewed.

Caimbeul's memoirs, Suathadh ri Iomadh Rubha, which won the £200 prize in a contest offered by the Gaelic Books Council, were also published at Glasgow in 1973. Of the memoir, Ronald Black has written, "It is a remarkable achievement consisting as it does of the memoirs of an exciting life, woven together with a forthright personal philosophy and much detailed ethnological commentary on tradition and change in island communities during the twentieth century, all steeped in a solution of anecdote, sometimes brilliantly funny. It is the twentieth century's leading work of Gaelic nonfictional prose."

Calum MacNeacail (1902–1978), a Scottish Gaelic poet from Gedintailor, Isle of Skye, served in the Royal Air Force during the Second World War. In his 1946 poem Cùmhnantan Sìthe Pharis ("The Paris Peace Treaties"), MacNeacail praised the atomic bombings of Hiroshima and Nagasaki and threatened the same fate against Joseph Stalin and Vyacheslav Molotov if the continued refusing to cooperate with the Western Allies.

South Africa
In South African poetry in English, Roy Campbell wrote several poems in favor of the Allied cause during the Second World War.

In Afrikaans literature, the main war poet of the Second World War is, like in the Spanish Civil War, Uys Krige.

Uys Krige served as a war correspondent with the South African Army during the Abyssinian Campaign and the North African Campaign. Captured at the Battle of Tobruk in 1941, he was sent to a POW camp in Fascist Italy from which he escaped after the overthrow of Benito Mussolini two years later. Krige was then smuggled back to Allied lines with the help of the Italian Resistance. Krige returned to South Africa able to speak fluent Italian. Krige subsequently wrote and published the English language war memoir, The Way Out, as well as war poetry in Afrikaans and short stories. Krige's collection Oorlogsgedigte ("War Poems"), was published in 1942.

Wales
Anglo-Welsh poet Alun Lewis, who was born at Cwmaman, near Aberdare in the Cynon Valley of the South Wales Coalfield, remains one if the most well-known English-language poets of the Second World War.

After the outbreak of the Second World War in September 1939, Lewis first joined the British Army Royal Engineers as an enlisted man because he was a pacifist, but still wished to aid the war effort. However, he then inexplicably sought and gained an officer's commission in an infantry battalion. In 1941 he collaborated with artists John Petts and Brenda Chamberlain on the "Caseg broadsheets". His first published book was the collection poetry Raider's Dawn and other poems (1942), which was followed up by a volume of short stories, The Last Inspection (1942). In 1942 he was sent to British India with the South Wales Borderers.

Lewis' poems about his war experiences have been described as showing "his brooding over his army experiences and trying to catch and hold some vision that would illuminate its desolation with meaning" (see Ian Hamilton "Alun Lewis Selected Poetry and Prose)

Lewis died on 5 March 1944, during the Burma campaign against the Imperial Japanese Army. He was found shot in the head, after shaving and washing, near the officers' latrines, and with his revolver in his hand.

Alun Lewis died from his wound six hours later. A British Army court of inquiry later concluded that Lewis had tripped and that the shooting was an accident. Alun Lewis lies buried at Taukkyan War Cemetery, located near Yangon, Myanmar.

Anglo-Welsh poet Dylan Thomas also wrote about the victims of Luftwaffe bombs during the Battle of Britain and about The Holocaust in his poem A Refusal to Mourn the Death, by Fire, of a Child in London.

United States
The mass slaughter and futility of World War I were so deeply ingrained upon the American people, that U.S. President Franklin Delano Roosevelt's efforts to bring the United States into the war against Nazi Germany were very unpopular.

The America First Committee, of which Charles Lindbergh was the spokesman, and the Communist Party of the United States of America were both organizing protests against Roosevelt's foreign policies. Opposition to American involvement in the war vanished completely, after the Imperial Japanese Navy attacked Pearl Harbor on 7 December 1941.

Although the Second World War is not usually thought of as a poet's war, there were American war poets.

In an interview for the documentary The Muse of Fire, U.S. Poet Laureate Richard Wilbur commented that there was a great difference between the war poets of World War I and those, like himself, who wrote and served during World War II. Wilbur explained that, unlike Siegfried Sassoon and Wilfred Owen, American World War II poets believed themselves to be fighting a just war and that Nazi Germany, Fascist Italy, and Imperial Japan were terrible enemies which needed to be confronted and destroyed. He did add that many World War II poets, including himself, felt sympathy for the plight of conscientious objectors.

After being thrown out of signals training and busted back to the ranks for expressing sympathy for the Communist Party of the United States of America, Richard Wilbur was shipped overseas as an enlisted man and served in the European theatre as a radio operator with the 36th U.S. Infantry Division. He was in combat during the Italian Campaign at the Battle of Anzio, the Battle of Monte Cassino, and in the Liberation of Rome. He was ultimately promoted to the ranks of sergeant.

Sergeant Wilbur's war continued through the Landings in Southern France and in the final invasion of Nazi Germany. During his war service and over the decades that followed, Richard Wilbur wrote many war poems.

One of Wilbur's best-known war poems is Tywater, about the combat death of Corporal Lloyd Tywater, a former Texas rodeo cowboy with a talent for rope tricks, knife throwing, and shooting swallows out of the sky with a pistol.

Another famous war poem by Richard Wilbur is First Snow in Alsace, which lyrically describes the horrors of a recent battlefield in Occupied France being covered up by the beautiful sight of new-fallen snow.

Anthony Hecht, an American poet of German Jewish ancestry, served in the European Theater as a G.I. with the 97th U.S. Infantry Division. Hecht not only saw combat in the Ruhr pocket and in Occupied Czechoslovakia, but also helped liberate Flossenbürg concentration camp. After the liberation, Hecht interviewed survivors to gather evidence for the prosecution of Nazi war crimes. Decades later, Hecht sought treatment for PTSD and used his war experiences as the subject of many of his poems.

American poet Dunstan Thompson, a native of New London, Connecticut, began publishing his poems while serving as a soldier in the European Theater during World War II. Thompson's poems depict military service through the eyes of a homosexual, who is engaged in casual encounters with soldiers and sailors in Blitzed London.

Karl Shapiro, a stylish writer with a commendable regard for his craft, wrote poetry in the Pacific Theater while he served there during World War II. His collection V-Letter and Other Poems, written while Shapiro was stationed in New Guinea, was awarded the Pulitzer Prize for Poetry in 1945, while Shapiro was still in the military. Shapiro was American Poet Laureate in 1946 and 1947. (At the time this title was consultant in poetry to the Library of Congress, which was changed by Congress in 1985 to Poet Laureate Consultant in Poetry to the Library of Congress.).

Also, while serving in the U.S. Army, the American poet Randall Jarrell published his second book of poems, Little Friend, Little Friend (1945) based on his wartime experiences. The book includes one of Jarrell's best-known war poems, "The Death of the Ball Turret Gunner." In his follow-up book, Losses (1948), he also focused on the war. The poet Robert Lowell stated publicly that he thought Jarrell had written "the best poetry in English about the Second World War."

Romania
The Romanian-born poet Paul Celan wrote war poetry including "Todesfuge" (translated into English as "Death Fugue", and "Fugue of Death",) a German poem written by probably around 1945 and first published in 1948. It is "among Celan's most well-known and often-anthologized poems". The is regarded as a "masterful description of horror and death in a concentration camp". Celan was born to a Jewish family in Cernauti, Romania; his parents were murdered during the Holocaust, and Celan himself was a prisoner for a time in a concentration camp.

Tristan Tzara was a Romanian and French avant-garde poet, essayist, and performance artist, best for being one of the founders and central figures of the anti-establishment Dada movement. During the final part of his career, Tzara combined his humanist and anti-fascist perspective with a communist vision, joining the Republicans in the Spanish Civil War and the French Resistance during World War II, and serving a term in the National Assembly. Having spoken in favor of liberalization in the People's Republic of Hungary just before the Revolution of 1956, he distanced himself from the French Communist Party, of which he was by then a member. In 1960, he was among the intellectuals who protested against French war crimes in the Algerian War.

Japan

Ryuichi Tamura (1923–98) who served in the Imperial Japanese Navy during World War II is a major Japanese war poet. Following the war, he "helped begin a poetry magazine, The Waste Land" and those poets who contributed to it were "the Waste Land Poets."  The work of these writers was especially influenced by T. S. Eliot, Stephen Spender, C. Day-Lewis and W. H. Auden. Tamura's first book of poems, Four Thousand Days and Nights was published in 1956.

Sadako Kurihara was living in Hiroshima on 6 August 1945, and it was then "that her life was transformed from being a shopkeeper to becoming one of Japan's most controversial poets. Her first major collection of poems, Black Eggs, published in 1946", but it was heavily censored by the American Occupation Forces Censor, because of how she dealt with the horrors following the dropping of the atomic bombs on Japan. Kurihara has also "taken a stand on" the many Japanese war crimes that were committed during the occupation of China, "the mistreatment of Koreans in Japan, and the need for a world-wide ban on nuclear weapons".

General Tadamichi Kuribayashi, the overall commander of the Japanese forces during the Battle of Iwo Jima, was a poet and former diplomat who had been assigned to Washington, D.C., during the Interwar Period. Having seen America's military and industrial power first hand, Kuribayashi opposed Prime Minister Hideki Tojo's decision to attack Pearl Harbor, saying, "The United States is the last country in the world Japan should fight." It was ultimately decided to assign Kuribayashi to the suicide mission of defending Iwo Jima to silence his criticisms of the war.

On 17 March 1945, the General sent his farewell message to Imperial Headquarters accompanied by three traditional death poems in waka form. Both were, according to historian Kumiko Kakehashi, "a subtle protest against the military command that so casually sent men out to die."

Unable to complete this heavy task for our country
Arrows and bullets all spent, so sad we fall.

But unless I smite the enemy,
My body cannot rot in the field.
Yea, I shall be born again seven times
And grasp the sword in my hand.

When ugly weeds cover this island,
My sole thought shall be the Imperial Land.

The poems and the message were heavily rewritten by Japanese military censors before being published and all anti-war sentiments were removed. Instead of describing the General and his soldiers as feeling "sad" to fall in battle, Japanese censors rewrote the poem to say that they died in Banzai charges, which the General had forbidden on Iwo Jima as an unnecessary waste of his men's lives. The uncensored text of both the message and the poems were only published after the Surrender of Japan.

Later wars

Korean War
The Korean War inspired the war poetry of Rolando Hinojosa, a Mexican-American poet from Mercedes, Texas, and of William Wantling, a Beat poet who is now known to have lied about the fact that he never actually served in combat. (See Stolen Valor).

On 28 March 1956, when BBC Scotland played a recording of a Scottish Gaelic language ceilidh by the soldiers of the King's Own Cameron Highlanders during the Korean War, Dòmhnall Ruadh Chorùna, who has served in the same regiment during World War I, was listening. He later composed the poem Gillean Chorea ("The Lads in Korea"), in which he declared that the recording had brought back his youth.

Cold War
On 1 November 1952, the United States successfully detonated "Ivy Mike", the first hydrogen bomb, on the island of Elugelab in Enewetak Atoll, in the Marshall Islands, as part of Operation Ivy. On 22 November 1955, the Soviet Union followed suit with the successful testing of RDS-37, which had been developed by Andrei Sakharov, Vitaly Ginzburg, and Yakov Zel'dovich, at the Semipalatinsk Test Site in northeastern Kazakhstan.

In his poem Òran an H-Bomb ("The Song of the H-Bomb"), North Uist poet Dòmhnall Ruadh Chorùna commented on how, after an attack against German trenches during World War I, the stretcher-bearers would come by sunset to pick up the wounded. But now, due to weapons like the hydrogen bomb, he continued, nothing would be spared, neither man nor beast, neither the beaches nor the mountaintops. Only one or two such bombs would suffice, he said, to completely wipe out the islands where Gaelic is spoken and everyone and everything in them. But Dòmhnall urged his listeners to trust that Jesus Christ, who died on the Cross out of love for the human race, would never permit such a terrible destruction to fall on those whose sins he redeemed through his blood and the wounds in his hands and his side.

Vietnam War
The Vietnam War also produced war poets, including Armenian-American poet Michael Casey whose début collection, Obscenities, drew on his service with the Military Police Corps in the Quảng Ngãi Province of South Vietnam. The book won the 1972 Yale Younger Poets Award.

W. D. Ehrhart, a United States Marine Corps Sergeant who won the Purple Heart in the Battle of Huế during the Tet Offensive, has since been dubbed "the Dean of Vietnam War poetry."

At the height of the Vietnam War in 1967, American poet Richard Wilbur composed A Miltonic Sonnet for Mr. Johnson on His Refusal of Peter Hurd's Official Portrait. In a clear cut case of "criticism from the Right", Wilbur compares U.S. President Lyndon Baines Johnson with Thomas Jefferson and finds the former to be greatly wanting. Commenting that Jefferson "would have wept to see small nations dread/ The imposition of our cattle brand," and that in Jefferson's term, "no army's blood was shed", Wilbur urges President Johnson to seriously consider how history will judge him and his Administration.

Rob Jacques, a Vietnam-Era United States Navy veteran, has explored the tension between love and violence in war from the perspective of homosexual servicemen in his collection, War Poet, published by Sibling Rivalry Press.

Yusef Komunyakaa (formerly James Willie Brown, Jr.), an African-American poet from Bogalusa, Louisiana, served in the United States Army during the Vietnam War as an editor for the military newspaper Southern Cross and was awarded a Bronze Star. He has since used his war experiences as the source of his poetry collections Toys in a Field (1986) and Dien Cau Dau (1988). Komunyakaa has said that following his return to the United States, he found the American people's rejection of Vietnam veterans to be every bit as painful as the racism he had experienced while growing up the American South before the Civil Rights Movement. Komyunakaa went on, however, to become the first African-American poet whose verse won a Pulitzer Prize.

Another poet of the Vietnam War is Bruce Weigl.

Caitlín Maude, an Irish-language poet, actress, and sean-nós singer from Casla in the Connemara Gaeltacht, composed the poem Amhrán grá Vietnam ("Vietnamese Love Song"), which tells a story of love and hope amidst the fighting and the destruction caused by both sides.

War on Terror

Most recently, the Iraq War has produced war poets including Brian Turner whose début collection, Here, Bullet, is based on his experience as an infantry team leader with the 3rd Stryker Brigade Combat Team from November 2003 until November 2004 in Iraq. The book won numerous awards including the 2005 Beatrice Hawley Award, the 2006 Maine Literary Award in Poetry, and the 2006 Northern California Book Award in Poetry. The book also was an Editor's Choice in The New York Times and received significant attention from the press including reviews and notices on NPR and in The New Yorker, The Global and Mail, and the Library Journal. In The New Yorker, Dana Goodyear wrote that, "As a war poet, [Brian Turner] sidesteps the classic distinction between romance and irony, opting instead for the surreal."

Erika Renee Land is an American 21st-century war poet, 2021MacDowell Fellow and author, that served in Mosul, Iraq from 2005 to 2006. She has published two poetry collections that chronicle her experiences as a pharmacy technician while helping the Global War on Terrorism efforts. She has also written and performed a one-woman play titled PTSD and ME: A Journey told through poetry consisting of a collection of poetic monologues and Spoken word that lays bare the horror and humor of war.

In popular culture

Music
 The 1876 opera Nikola Šubić Zrinski by Croatian composer Ivan Zajc, is based on Brne Karnarutić's epic poem  Vazetje Sigeta grada, about the Battle of Szigetvár.
 The 1887 opera Prince Igor, by Russian composer Alexander Borodin, is based on The Tale of Igor's Campaign (Слово о пълкѹ Игоревѣ).
 The 1951 Edinburgh People's Festival Ceilidh brought Scottish traditional music to a large public stage for the first time and is now considered to be one of the beginnings of the British folk revival. The concert took place inside Edinburgh's Oddfellows Hall and continued long afterwards at St. Columba's Church Hall on Friday August 26, 1951. The Gàidhealtachd of Scotland was represented by Gaelic singers Flora MacNeil, Calum Johnston, and by bagpiper John Burgess. During the concert, two Gaelic war poems of the Jacobite rising of 1745 were performed. Barra-native Calum Johnston, who was "keen to show his own admiration for [the] poet and for the Highlanders who fought for Charlie", performed Alasdair Mac Mhaighstir Alasdair's Òran Eile don Phrionnsa. Flora MacNeil, a fellow native of Barra who would go on to become a legendary Gaelic singer, then performed, Mo rùn geal òg, Christine Ferguson's lament for the death of her husband, who fell while bearing the standard for the Chief of Clan Chisholm at the Battle of Culloden in 1746.
 English composer Benjamin Britten incorporated eight of Wilfred Owen's war poems into War Requiem, along with words from the Tridentine Requiem Mass (Missa pro Defunctis). War Requiem was commissioned for the reconsecration of Coventry Cathedral and was first performed there on 30 May 1962.
 Several poems from Yusef Komunyakaa's Vietnam War collection Dien Cai Dau (1988), the title of which derives from a derogatory term in Vietnamese for American soldiers, were set to music by composer Elliot Goldenthan as part of Fire Water Paper: A Vietnam Oratorio.
 In the 2008 album Dual, a collaboration between Irish and Scottish folk musicians Éamonn Doorley, Muireann Nic Amhlaoibh, Ross Martin, and Julie Fowlis, Fowlis recorded An Eala Bhàn, an iconic Scottish Gaelic love song by World War I poet Dòmhnall Ruadh Chorùna. In her 2009 album Uam, Scottish folk singer Fowlis recorded Breton World War I poet Yann-Ber Kalloc'h's most famous song, Me 'zo Ganet kreiz ar e mor ("I was Born in the Middle of the Sea"). The lyrics were first translated from the original Breton language into Fowlis' native Scottish Gaelic. On the 2018 album Allt, Fowlis performs Dòmhnall Ruadh Chorùna's war poem, Air an Somme ("The Song of the Somme") with Éamonn Doorley, Zoë Conway and John McIntyre.
 In 2012, New Zealander and Classical composer Richard Oswin set to music Australian war poet Leon Gellert's poem The Last to Leave as part of Three Gallipoli Settings, a choral work commissioned by the New Zealand Secondary Students' Choir.
 American composer Patrick Zimmerli's oratorio Alan Seeger: Instrument of Destiny, which combines European opera and American jazz music, sets to music the poems, letters, and diary entries of American war poet Alan Seeger. The oratorio was first performed in 2017 at St. John the Divine Cathedral in New York City.

In film
 In the 1940 film The Fighting 69th, which tells the story of the Irish-American Doughboys from New York City who served in the regiment of the same name during World War I, American war poet Joyce Kilmer (Jeffrey Lynn) appears onscreen. The live burial of 21 American Doughboys by a German artillery barrage in the Rouge-Bouquet forest, about which Kilmer wrote his most famous war poem, is also shown onscreen.
 At the beginning of the 1990 film Memphis Belle, directed by Michael Caton-Jones, Sgt. Daniel Daly (Eric Stoltz), a proudly Irish-American radio operator in the United States Army Air Force during World War II, recites William Butler Yeats' An Irish Airman Foresees His Death to his fellow crewmembers of a B-17 Flying Fortress.
 The 1992 Welsh language anti-war biographical film Hedd Wyn depicts war poet Ellis Humphrey Evans (Huw Garmon) as a tragic hero, with an intense dislike of the jingoism, ultranationalism, militarism, Anglophilia, and Germanophobia that surrounds him. The film also focuses on Evans' pursuit of his lifelong dream of winning the Bardic Chair at the National Eisteddfod of Wales and on his three-year-long battle against overwhelming pressure to, "join up," during the First World War. The film's emotional impact is increased when the real Hedd Wyn's love poetry and war poetry are read in voiceover at key moments of the film. Hedd Wyn won the Royal Television Society's Television Award for Best Single Drama. It also became the first British motion picture to be nominated for Best Foreign Language Film at the Academy Awards.
 Director Mel Gibson's 1995 film Braveheart, a biopic of iconic Scottish nationalist leader Sir William Wallace, was according to its screenwriter, Randall Wallace, based heavily upon Blind Harry's 15th century epic poem The Wallace. Several allusions to poems by Robert Burns about the Scottish Wars of Independence also appear in the film.
 In the 1995 drama film Mr. Holland's Opus, directed by Stephen Herek, high school gym teacher and football coach Bill Meister (Jay Thomas) reads Lieutenant-Colonel John McCrae's In Flanders' Fields aloud during the military funeral of Lou Russ (Terrence Howard), a former student who has been killed serving in the United States Marine Corps during the Vietnam War.
 The 1997 film Regeneration focuses on the institutionalisation of English war poet Siegfried Sassoon (James Wilby) and Anglo-Welsh war poet Wilfred Owen (Stuart Bunce) and their treatment by psychiatrist William Rivers (Jonathan Pryce) at Craiglockart War Hospital in Edinburgh during World War I. The film particularly focuses on the character arc of Lt. Sassoon, who, following his open letter demanding a negotiated peace in  The Times, has been declared insane and remains confined to the hospital until he volunteers to return to active service on the Western Front.
 The 2014 film Testament of Youth tells the story of star-crossed lovers and war poets Vera Brittain (Alicia Vikander) and Roland Leighton (Kit Harrington). As in Hedd Wyn, Roland Leighton is depicted as a tragic hero and his love poetry and war poetry are recited in voiceover at key moments of the film. 
 The 2017 stage play Death Comes for the War Poets, by Joseph Pearce, weaves, "a verse tapestry," about the military and spiritual journeys of Siegfried Sassoon and Wilfred Owen.
 The 2019 biographical film Tolkien focuses on the early life of fantasy novelist and poet J.R.R. Tolkien (Nicholas Hoult), his service in the British Army during World War I, and his close friendship with fellow war poet Geoffrey Bache Smith (Anthony Boyle). Shortly after Tolkien learns of Smith's death at the Battle of the Somme, the real Geoffrey Smith's last letter to Tolkien is read aloud in voiceover. The film then shows how Tolkien edited his fallen friend's poetry for publication and wrote the foreword himself.
 The 2021 biographical film Benediction, directed by Terence Davies, stars Jack Lowden and Peter Capaldi as English war poet Siegfried Sassoon at different periods of his life. In the same film, Wilfred Owen is played by Matthew Tennyson.

In television
 In the 1984 Peanuts television special What Have We Learned, Charlie Brown?, Lieutenant-Colonel John McCrae's In Flanders' Fields is read aloud at a World War I cemetery in France by Linus van Pelt (Jeremy Schoenberg).
 The 1989 BBC sitcom Blackadder Goes Forth, which is set in the trenches of the Western Front during World War I, repeatedly lampoons the absurdity of, "the mud, the death, the endless poetry", and particularly takes swipes at the romantic idealism found in the war poems of Rupert Brooke.

See also
 Epic poetry
 War novel

References

Bibliography
Ghosal, Sukriti. War Poetry – The New Sensibilities. Kindle Edition, 2015. ASIN: B00XH4O74Q.
O'Prey, Paul (ed). First World War: Poems from the Front (Imperial War Museum, 2014) 
Roy, Pinaki. The Scarlet Critique: A Critical Anthology of War Poetry. New Delhi: Sarup Book Publishers Pvt. Ltd., 2010. .
Ruzich, Constance. International Poetry of the First World War; An anthology of lost voices. London: Bloomsbury Academic, 2021. .
Silkin, Jon. Out of Battle: The Poetry of the Great War. Basingstoke: Palgrave Macmillan, 1972. Rpt. 1998.  .

External links
BBudgen, David: Literature (Version 1.1), in: 1914-1918-online. International Encyclopedia of the First World War.
 Poetry of the Boer War, St Andrew's University 
 Japanese War poets 
 Potter, Jane: Literature (Great Britain and Ireland), in: 1914-1918-online. International Encyclopedia of the First World War.
 Whalan, Mark: Literature (USA), in: 1914-1918-online. International Encyclopedia of the First World War.
 A selection of Boer War poems 
 War Poems From Iraq
 War Poets Association
 The First World War Poetry Digital Archive
 Pro Patria (1917) by Philadelphia poet Florence Earle Coates (1850–1927) pamphlet of poems in support of American involvement in WW1 
 Dean F. Echenberg War Poetry Collection at the Ransom Center, University of Texas, Austin. Over 7000 volumes of War Poetry
 

 
Poetry movements
Genres of poetry